= Brian Hegarty =

Scotland international rugby union player

- Born: Charles Brian Hegarty; 29 November 1950 (age 75) Hawick, Scotland
- Height: 6 ft 5 in (1.96 m)
- Weight: 20 st 0 lb (127 kg)

Rugby union career
- Position: Flanker
Amateur team(s)
Years	Team	Apps	(Points)
1968 -	Hawick		
Provincial / State sides
Years	Team	Apps	(Points)
-	South of Scotland District		
1978	Whites Trial		
International career
Years	Team	Apps	(Points)
1977	Scotland 'B'		
1978	Scotland		
Coaching career
- Years: Team
- -: Hawick

Charles Brian Hegarty (born 29 November 1950) is a former Scotland international rugby union player and coach. He played at Flanker.

== Rugby Union career ==
=== Amateur career ===
He also played for Hawick RFC.

He won the Earlston Sevens and the Selkirk Sevens for Hawick in 1969.

=== Provincial career ===
He played for South of Scotland District in the 1976-77 season Scottish Inter-District Championship. The South won the title that year.

He played for the Whites Trial side on 7 January 1978.

He won the Scottish Inter-District Championship in the 1978-79 season again for the South, their ninth outright title.

=== International career ===
He was called up to the Scotland 'B' squad for the match against France 'B' on 5 February 1977.

He was capped four times in 1978 for the senior Scotland side.

=== Coaching career ===
He went on to coach Hawick.

== Family ==
He is the son of John Hegarty, who was also capped for Scotland.
