= 1899–1900 Scottish Districts season =

Rugby union competition

- Countries: Scotland
- Date: 1899–1900
- Matches played: 1

The 1899–1900 Scottish Districts season is a record of all the rugby union matches for Scotland's district teams.

== History ==
Edinburgh District beat Glasgow District for the first time in 10 years, in the Inter-City match.

== Results ==
Date	Try	Conversion	Penalty	Dropped goal	Goal from mark	Notes
1894–1904	3 points	2 points	3 points	4 points	4 points	

=== Inter-City ===
2 December 1899

Glasgow District	1 penalty goal - 3 tries	Edinburgh District
	Report

Hamilton Crescent, Glasgow

Glasgow District:
Edinburgh District:

=== Other Scottish matches ===
18 November 1899

North of Scotland District	25 - 0	Midlands District
	Report

King's College grounds, Aberdeen

North of Scotland:
Midlands:

9 December 1899

North of Scotland District	4 - 3	South-West of Scotland
	Preview; Report

University Grounds, Aberdeen

North of Scotland:
South-West:

23 December 1899

South of Scotland District	0 - 33	Anglo-Scots
	Report; Report; Report

South of Scotland:
Anglo-Scots:

=== English matches ===
No other District matches played.

=== International matches ===
No touring matches this season.
