= 1889–90 Scottish Districts season =

Rugby union competition

- Countries: Scotland
- Date: 1889–90
- Matches played: 1

The 1889–90 Scottish Districts season is a record of all the rugby union matches for Scotland's district teams.

== History ==
The Midlands District was founded in this year.

Glasgow District and North of Scotland District were due to play at Forfar on 14 December 1889. Edinburgh District and South of Scotland District were due to play at Galashiels on 14 December 1889. Both matches were called off due to the weather despite the teams all showing up for play. The South team was selected.

The Fettesian side called off the match against North of Scotland District due to the hardness of the ground. The North side were ready to play and The Scotsman noted that much disappointment was caused by the decision of the Fettesian captain Wauchope.

== Results ==
| Date | Try | Conversion | Penalty | Dropped goal | Goal from mark | Notes |
|---|---|---|---|---|---|---|
| 1886–1891 | 1 point | 2 points | 3 points | 3 points | —N/a | Scoring systems after the administration of the game was taken over by the IRFB now known as World Rugby |

=== Inter-City ===
7 December 1889

| Glasgow District | 0 - 3 | Edinburgh District |
| | Report | Drop: Aitchison |

Hamilton Crescent, Glasgow

Glasgow District: A. Lede (Glasgow University), W. J. Reid (West of Scotland), C. F. P. Fraser (Glasgow University), J. J. Mitchell (Glasgow Academicals), C. E. Orr (West of Scotland), C. E. McEwan (West of Scotland), W. A. Macdonald [captain], E. M. Donaldson (Glasgow University), K. M. Bishop (Glasgow Academicals), J. D. Boswell (West of Scotland), J. E. Orr (West of Scotland), W. Auld (West of Scotland), H. F. Menzies (West of Scotland), E. H. Wynne (West of Scotland), R. O. Caw (Kelvinside Academicals),
Edinburgh District: A. W. Cameron (Watsonians), W. C. Smith (Edinburgh University), H. J. Stevenson (Edinburgh Academicals), J. Duncan (Edinburgh Academicals), F. B. Majoribanks (Edinburgh Academicals), G. R. Aitchison (Edinburgh Wanderers), A. M. Gordon(Edinburgh Academicals) [captain], W. R. Ferguson (Edinburgh Academicals), (Edinburgh Academicals) A. A. Scot-Skirving (Edinburgh Academicals), A. Duke (Royal HSFP), R. J. Davidson (Royal HSFP), P. H. Blyth (Watsonians), R.M. M. Roddich (Watsonians), A. T. Aitken (Edinburgh Institution)

=== Other Scottish matches ===
21 December 1889

| North of Scotland District | cancelled | Fettesian-Lorettonians |
| | Preview |

University Grounds, King Street, Aberdeen

North of Scotland District:
Fettesian-Lorettonians:

24 December 1889

| Midlands District | 0 - 3 goals | Fettesian-Lorettonians |
| | Report |

St. Andrews

Midlands District:
Fettesian-Lorettonians:

=== English matches ===
No other District matches played.

=== International matches ===
No touring matches this season.
