= 1925–26 Scottish Districts season =

Rugby union competition

- Countries: Scotland
- Date: 1925–26
- Matches played: 1

The 1925–26 Scottish Districts season is a record of all the rugby union matches for Scotland's district teams.

== History ==
The Inter-City match was cancelled due to frost.

The final trial match of December 1925 was abandoned, fifteen minutes before kick off, due to frost and not played.

== Results ==
Date	Try	Conversion	Penalty	Dropped goal	Goal from mark	Notes
1905–1947	3 points	2 points	3 points	4 points	3 points	

=== Inter-City ===
No match played.

=== Other Scottish matches ===
31 October 1925

Midlands District	32 – 9	Edinburgh District
	Report; Report

Ladybank

Midlands District:
Edinburgh District:

14 November 1925

Midlands District	–	North of Scotland District
	Preview

Dundee

Midlands District:
North of Scotland District:

21 November 1925

South of Scotland District	–	North of Scotland District
	Preview

Hawick

South of Scotland District:
North of Scotland District:

=== Trial matches ===
19 December 1925

Scotland Probables	Not played	Scotland Possibles
	Report

Murrayfield

Scotland Probables:
Scotland Possibles:

=== English matches ===
No other District matches played.

=== International matches ===
No touring matches this season.
