= 1987–88 Scottish Inter-District Championship =

Rugby union competition

- Countries: Scotland
- Date: 1987–88
- Champions: Edinburgh District
- Runners-up: South
- Matches played: 10

The 1987–88 Scottish Inter-District Championship was a rugby union competition for Scotland's district teams.

This season saw the 35th formal Scottish Inter-District Championship.

== History ==
Edinburgh District won the competition with four wins.

South of Scotland District won the sponsor McEwans tankards for scoring the most number of tries in the championship, with 17 tries. The others scored:- Anglo-Scots (11 tries), Edinburgh District (9 tries), Glasgow District (6 tries) and North and Midlands (5 tries).

== 1987-88 League Table ==
Team	P	W	D	L	PF	PA	+/-	Pts
Edinburgh District	4	4	0	0	88	55	+33	8
South	4	3	0	1	115	32	+83	6
Anglo-Scots	4	2	0	2	84	58	+26	4
Glasgow District	4	1	0	3	53	104	-51	2
North and Midlands	4	0	0	4	50	141	-91	0

== Results ==
Date	Try	Conversion	Penalty	Dropped goal	Goal from mark	Notes
1977–1991	4 points	2 points	3 points	3 points	—	

=== Round 1 ===
28 November 1987

Anglo-Scots	16 – 21	South of Scotland District
	Report

Mayfield, Dundee
Referee: R. J. Megson (Edinburgh Wanderers)

Anglo-Scots:
South of Scotland District:

28 November 1987

Glasgow District	12 – 19	Edinburgh District
	Report

Hughenden Stadium
Referee: K. W. McCartney (Hawick)

Glasgow District:
Edinburgh District:

=== Round 2 ===
30 November 1987

North and Midlands	12 – 22	Anglo-Scots
	Preview; Report

McKane Park, Dunfermline
Referee: J. Johnston (Gala)

North and Midlands:
Anglo-Scots:

5 December 1987

South of Scotland District	32 – 0	Glasgow District
	Report

The Greenyards, Melrose
Referee: J. M. Fleming (Boroughmuir)

South of Scotland District:
Glasgow District:

=== Round 3 ===
12 December 1987

Edinburgh District	38 – 25	North and Midlands
	Report

Murrayfield Stadium
Referee: P. C. Robertson (Hawick)

Edinburgh District:
North and Midlands:

12 December 1987

Glasgow District	10 – 40	Anglo-Scots
	Report

Burnbrae, Milngavie
Referee: K. D. Harrower (Forrester F.P.)

Glasgow District:
Anglo-Scots:

=== Round 4 ===
19 December 1987

Anglo-Scots	6 – 15	Edinburgh District
	Report

Richmond, London
Referee: A. P. Thomson (London)

Anglo-Scots:
Edinburgh District:

19 December 1987

South of Scotland District	50 – 0	North and Midlands
	Report

Mansfield Park, Hawick
Referee: M. S. Clayton (Whitecraigs)

South of Scotland District:
North and Midlands:

=== Round 5 ===
26 December 1987

North and Midlands	13 – 31	Glasgow District
	Preview; Report

Mayfield, Dundee
Referee: J. B. Anderson (Currie)

North and Midlands:
Glasgow District:

26 December 1987

Edinburgh District	16 – 12	South of Scotland District
	Report

Myreside, Edinburgh
Referee: C. J. High (England)

Edinburgh District:
South of Scotland District:

== Matches outwith the Championship ==
=== Other Scottish matches ===
14 October 1987

Glasgow trial	-

Bellsland

Glasgow trial:
-:

28 October 1987

Midlands Trial	-

North Inch, Perth

Midland Trial:
-:

=== Junior matches ===
12 September 1987

Glasgow	-	Ulster Juniors

Lochshore, Garnock

Glasgow:
Ulster Juniors:

4 November 1987

South	-	Glasgow

Poynder Park

South:
Glasgow:

4 November 1987

Edinburgh	-	Midlands District

Meggetland

Edinburgh:
Midlands District:

18 November 1987

Glasgow District	-	Midlands District

Hughenden Stadium

Glasgow District:
Midlands District:

18 November 1987

Edinburgh	-	South of Scotland District

Stoneyhill

Edinburgh District:
South of Scotland District:

=== Trial matches ===
2 January 1988

Blues Trial	43 - 6	Reds Trial
	Report

Murrayfield Stadium
Referee: J. B. Anderson (Currie)

Blues:
Reds:

=== English matches ===
5 September 1987

Harlequins	29 - 22	Glasgow District
	Report

Twickenham
Referee: R. Jenkins (London)

Harlequins:
Glasgow District:

7 September 1987

Kent	-	Glasgow District

Blackheath

Kent:
Glasgow District:

=== Irish matches ===
12 September 1987

Blackrock College	-	North and Midlands

Blackrock, Dublin

Blackrock College:
North and Midlands:

13 September 1987

Terenure College	-	North and Midlands

Lakelands Park, Dublin

Terenure College:
North and Midlands:

17 September 1987

Edinburgh District	-	Leinster

Inverleith

Edinburgh District:
Leinster:

19 September 1987

South of Scotland	-	Leinster

Philiphaugh

South of Scotland:
Leinster:

=== International matches ===
16 September 1987

Glasgow District	-	France

Hughenden Stadium

Glasgow District:
France:

19 September 1987

Anglo-Scots	-	France

Duffus Park, Cupar

Anglo-Scots:
France:

23 September 1987

Edinburgh District	-	France

Goldenacre, Edinburgh

Edinburgh District:
France:
