= 1961–62 Scottish Inter-District Championship =

Rugby union competition

- Countries: Scotland
- Date: 1961–62
- Champions: Edinburgh / South
- Runners-up: North and Midlands
- Matches played: 6

The 1961–62 Scottish Inter-District Championship was a rugby union competition for Scotland's district teams.

This season saw the ninth formal Scottish Inter-District Championship.

Edinburgh District and South shared the competition with two wins and a draw.

== 1961–62 League Table ==
Team	P	W	D	L	PF	PA	+/-	Pts
Edinburgh District	3	2	1	0	37	9	+28	5
South	3	2	1	0	30	9	+21	5
North and Midlands	3	1	0	2	23	29	-6	2
Glasgow District	3	0	0	3	9	52	-43	0

== Results ==
Date	Try	Conversion	Penalty	Dropped goal	Goal from mark	Notes
1948–1970	3 points	2 points	3 points	3 points	3 points	

=== Round 1 ===
14 October 1961

South of Scotland District	18 – 6	Glasgow District
	Preview; Report

The Greenyards. Melrose
Referee: J. R. Hunter (Stewart's College F.P.)

South:
Glasgow District:

=== Round 2 ===
4 November 1961

North and Midlands	–	South of Scotland District

Aberdeen

North and Midlands:
South of Scotland District:

=== Round 3 ===
18 November 1961

Edinburgh District	–	North and Midlands

Murrayfield Stadium

Edinburgh District:
North and Midlands:

=== Round 4 ===
2 December 1961

Glasgow District	–	Edinburgh District

Hughenden Stadium

Glasgow District:
Edinburgh District:

=== Round 5 ===
20 January 1962

South of Scotland District	–	Edinburgh District

Kelso

South:
Edinburgh District:

=== Round 6 ===
10 February 1962

North and Midlands	–	Glasgow District

Aberdeen

North and Midlands:
Glasgow District:

== Matches outwith the Championship ==
=== Other Scottish matches ===
27 September 1961

Glasgow District	5 – 9	Ayrshire and Renfrewshire
	Report

Auldhouse, Glasgow

Glasgow District:
Ayrshire and Renfrewshire:

7 October 1961

Rest of the West	–	Glasgow District

Rest of the West:
Glasgow District:

21 October 1961

Midlands District	–	North of Scotland District

Midlands District:
North of Scotland District:

=== Junior matches ===
11 November 1961

West	–	East

West:
East:

27 January 1962

Glasgow	–	South

Glasgow District:
South of Scotland District:

10 March 1962

Midlands District	–	South

Midlands District:
South of Scotland District:

21 March 1962

Glasgow	–	(Ireland) Ulster

Glasgow District:
Ulster:

18 November 1961

Edinburgh District	–	Midlands District

Murrayfield Stadium

Edinburgh District:
Midlands District:

=== Trial matches ===
16 December 1961

Blues Trial	5 – 19	Whites Trial
	Report

Murrayfield Stadium
Referee: D. C. J. McMahon (Heriots)

Blues Trial:
Whites Trial:

30 December 1961

Scotland Probables	8 – 12	Scotland Possibles
	Report

Murrayfield Stadium

Probables:
Possibles:

=== English matches ===
27 September 1961

Northumberland	8 – 6	Edinburgh District
	Preview; Report; Report

Gosforth
Referee: J. Blakes (Northumberland)

Northumberland:
Edinburgh District:

27 September 1961

Scottish Border Club	35 – 8	Durham County
	Preview; Report

Mansfield Park, Hawick
Referee: J. H. Imrie (Hawick)

Scottish Border Club:
Durham County:

3 October 1961

North of England	8 – 16	Scottish Border Club
	Report

Brough Park, Workington
Referee: W. H. Gillmore (RFU)

North of England:
Scottish Border Club:

=== International matches ===
None.
