= 1980–81 Scottish Inter-District Championship =

Rugby union competition

- Countries: Scotland
- Date: 1980–81
- Champions: South
- Runners-up: Glasgow District
- Matches played: 6

The 1980–81 Scottish Inter-District Championship was a rugby union competition for Scotland's district teams.

This season saw the 28th Scottish Inter-District Championship.

South won the competition with 3 wins.

== 1980-81 League Table ==
Team	P	W	D	L	PF	PA	+/-	Pts
South	3	3	0	0	86	12	+74	6
Glasgow District	3	2	0	1	48	54	-6	4
Edinburgh District	3	1	0	2	74	33	+41	2
North and Midlands	3	0	0	3	9	118	-109	0

== Results ==
Date	Try	Conversion	Penalty	Dropped goal	Goal from mark	Notes
1977–1991	4 points	2 points	3 points	3 points	—	

=== Round 1 ===
6 December 1980

Edinburgh District	–	Glasgow District

Edinburgh

Edinburgh District:
Glasgow District:

6 December 1980

North and Midlands	–	South

Aberdeen

North and Midlands:
South:

=== Round 2 ===
13 December 1980

North and Midlands	0 – 50	Edinburgh District
	Preview; Report

McKane Park, Dunfermline

North and Midlands:
Edinburgh District:

=== Round 3 ===
20 December 1980

South	–	Edinburgh District

Jedburgh

South:
Edinburgh District:

20 December 1980

Glasgow District	–	North and Midlands

Hughenden Stadium

Glasgow District:
North and Midlands:

=== Round 4 ===
27 December 1980

South	–	Glasgow District

Netherdale, Galashiels

South:
Glasgow District:

== Matches outwith the Championship ==
=== Other Scottish matches ===
8 October 1980

Glasgow District	–	Rest of the West

Bellsland

Glasgow:
Rest of the West:

13 December 1980

South	23 – 10	Anglo-Scots
	Report

Mansfield Park, Hawick
Referee: W. O. Davies (Wales)

South:
Anglo-Scots:

27 December 1980

Anglo-Scots	–	Edinburgh District

Anglo-Scots:
Edinburgh District:

=== Junior matches ===
5 November 1980

Glasgow District	–	South

Hughenden

Glasgow:
South:

25 November 1980

South	–	Midlands District

Kelso

South:
Midlands District:

26 November 1980

Edinburgh District	–	Glasgow District

Edinburgh District:
Glasgow District:

17 February 1981

South	–	Edinburgh District

Kelso

South:
Edinburgh District:

17 February 1981

Midlands District	–	Glasgow District

Cupar

Midlands District:
Glasgow District:

3 March 1981

Midlands District	–	Edinburgh District

Cupar

Midlands District:
Edinburgh District:

=== English matches ===
16 September 1980

(England) Durham County 'B'	15 - 26	Edinburgh District 'B'
	Report

Durham County 'B':
Edinburgh District 'B':

24 September 1980

(England) Yorkshire	-	Edinburgh District

Yorkshire:
Edinburgh District:

30 September 1980

South of Scotland District	26 - 27	(England) Durham County
	Report

Milntown, Langholm
Referee: I. C. Henderson (Trinity Academicals)

South of Scotland District:
Durham County:

=== Irish matches ===
6 September 1980

(Ireland) Connacht	3 - 15	Glasgow District
	Report

Referee: H. O'Connor (Connacht)

Connacht:
Glasgow District:

8 September 1980

(Ireland) Irish Army	3 - 35	Glasgow District
	Preview; Report

Referee: H. O'Connor (Connacht)

Irish Army:
Glasgow District:

17 September 1980

(Ireland) Connacht	6 - 6	South of Scotland District
	Report

Referee: H. O' Connor (Connacht)

Connacht:
South of Scotland District:

19 September 1980

(Ireland) Leinster	21 - 10	South of Scotland District
	Report

Referee: O. Doyle (Leinster)

Leinster:
South of Scotland District:

=== Welsh matches ===
15 September 1980

(Wales) Cardiff District	6 - 21	North and Midlands
	Report

Cardiff
Referee: T. Doocey (New Zealand)

Cardiff District:
North and Midlands:

16 September 1980

(Wales) Mid District	13 - 9	North and Midlands
	Score

Aberdark

Mid District:
North and Midlands:

18 September 1980

(Wales) East District	-	North and Midlands

Cardiff

Mid District:
North and Midlands:

=== Australian matches ===
15 October 1980

South of Scotland District	15 - 15	(Australia) Queensland
	Report

Netherdale
Referee: D. I. H. Burnett (Ireland)

South of Scotland District:
Queensland:

=== Trial matches ===
3 January 1981

Blues Trial	32 - 26	Whites Trial
	Report

Murrayfield Stadium
Referee: A. M. Hosie (Hillhead)

Blues:
Whites:
