= 1984–85 Scottish Inter-District Championship =

Rugby union competition

- Countries: Scotland
- Date: 1984–85
- Champions: South
- Runners-up: Edinburgh
- Matches played: 10

The 1984–85 Scottish Inter-District Championship was a rugby union competition for Scotland's district teams.

This season saw the 32nd Scottish Inter-District Championship.

South won the competition with four wins.

== 1984-85 League Table ==
Team	P	W	D	L	PF	PA	+/-	Pts
South	4	4	0	0	94	42	+52	8
Edinburgh District	4	3	0	1	82	59	+23	6
Anglo-Scots	4	2	0	2	72	44	+28	4
North and Midlands	4	1	0	3	40	103	-63	2
Glasgow District	4	0	0	4	28	68	-40	0

== Results ==
Date	Try	Conversion	Penalty	Dropped goal	Goal from mark	Notes
1977–1991	4 points	2 points	3 points	3 points	—	

=== Round 1 ===
24 November 1984

North and Midlands	12 – 21	Edinburgh District
	Report

Northern Meeting Park, Inverness
Referee: T. E. Allan (Melrose)

North and Midlands:
Edinburgh District:

24 November 1984

Glasgow District	6 – 10	South
	Report

Hughenden Stadium
Referee: D. N. Templeton (Ulster)

Glasgow District:
South of Scotland:

=== Round 2 ===
15 December 1984

Anglo-Scots	25 – 7	North and Midlands
	Report

Gateshead
Referee: P. C. Robertson (Hawick)

Anglo-Scots:
North and Midlands:

15 December 1984

South of Scotland	25 – 19	Edinburgh District
	Report

Netherdale, Galashiels
Referee: A. M. Hosie (Hillhead)

South of Scotland:
Edinburgh District:

=== Round 3 ===
22 December 1984

Edinburgh District	22 – 13	Anglo-Scots
	Report

Myreside
Referee: K. W. McCartney (Hawick)

Edinburgh District:
Anglo-Scots:

22 December 1984

Glasgow District	13 – 14	North and Midlands
	Report

Hughenden Stadium
Referee: D. Leslie (Manchester Society)

Glasgow District:
North and Midlands:

=== Round 4 ===
29 December 1984

Anglo-Scots	24 – 0	Glasgow District
	Report

Richmond
Referee: J. A. F. Trigg (London)

Anglo-Scots:
Glasgow District:

29 December 1984

North and Midlands	7 – 44	South
	Report

Referee: J. M. Fleming (Boroughmuir)

North and Midlands:
South of Scotland:

=== Round 5 ===
5 January 1985

Edinburgh District	–	Glasgow District

Edinburgh District:
Glasgow District:

5 January 1985

South	–	Anglo-Scots
	Preview

South of Scotland:
Anglo-Scots:

== Matches outwith the Championship ==
=== Other Scottish matches ===
3 October 1984

Rest of the West	–	Glasgow District

Hughenden

Rest of the West:
Glasgow District:

10 October 1984

Midlands District	–	North of Scotland District

Midlands District:
North of Scotland District:

=== Junior matches ===
20 September 1984

South Junior League Champions	–	South Junior League Select

South Junior League Champions:
South Junior League Select:

=== Trial matches ===
5 January 1985

Blues Trial	-	Reds Trial
	Preview

Murrayfield Stadium

Blues:
Reds:

=== English matches ===
10 September 1984

South of Scotland	–	Durham County

Selkirk

South:
Durham County:

=== Irish matches ===
15 September 1984

South of Scotland	–	Leinster

Melrose

South:
Leinster:

=== International matches ===
1 December 1984

South of Scotland District	9 – 6	Australia

Mansfield Park, Hawick

South of Scotland District:
Australia:

4 December 1984

Glasgow District	12 – 26	Australia
	Report

Hughenden stadium

Glasgow District:
Australia:
