= 1985–86 Scottish Inter-District Championship =

Rugby union competition

- Countries: Scotland
- Date: 1985–86
- Champions: South
- Runners-up: Edinburgh
- Matches played: 10

The 1985–86 Scottish Inter-District Championship was a rugby union competition for Scotland's district teams.

This season saw the 33nd Scottish Inter-District Championship.

South won the competition with 4 wins.

== History ==
The South beat their own record in the Scottish Inter-District Championship this season, by winning their 18th consecutive inter-district match in the championship. A run which began in season 1981-82.

== 1985-86 League Table ==
Team	P	W	D	L	PF	PA	+/-	Pts
South	4	4	0	0	74	32	+42	8
Edinburgh District	4	3	0	1	65	38	+27	6
Anglo-Scots	4	2	0	2	67	58	+9	4
Glasgow District	4	1	0	3	66	56	+10	2
North and Midlands	4	0	0	4	28	116	-88	0

== Results ==
Date	Try	Conversion	Penalty	Dropped goal	Goal from mark	Notes
1977–1991	4 points	2 points	3 points	3 points	—	

=== Round 1 ===
30 November 1985

Edinburgh District	29 – 12	North and Midlands
	Report

Murrayfield Stadium
Referee: G. I. Inglis (Selkirk)

Edinburgh District:
North and Midlands:

30 November 1985

South	19 – 16	Glasgow District
	Report

Murrayfield Stadium
Referee: J. M. Fleming

South of Scotland:
Glasgow District:

=== Round 2 ===
7 December 1985

South	29 – 0	North and Midlands
	Report

Riverside Park, Jedburgh
Referee: D. Leslie (Manchester)

South of Scotland:
North and Midlands:

=== Round 3 ===
14 December 1985

North and Midlands	6 – 28	Anglo-Scots
	Report

University Park, St. Andrews
Referee: D. Thomas (Edinburgh Wanderers)

North and Midlands:
Anglo-Scots:

14 December 1985

Edinburgh District	3 – 10	South
	Report

Myreside
Referee: G. M. Anderson (Allan Glen's)

Edinburgh District:
South of Scotland:

=== Round 4 ===
16 December 1985

Glasgow District	13 – 17	Anglo-Scots
	Report

Hughenden Stadium

Glasgow District:
Anglo-Scots:

=== Round 5 ===
21 December 1985

Anglo-Scots	9 – 23	Edinburgh District
	Report

Athletic Ground, Richmond
Referee: A. P. Thomson (London)

Anglo-Scots:
Edinburgh District:

21 December 1985

North and Midlands	10 – 30	Glasgow District
	Report

Seafield, Aberdeen
Referee: W. W. Calder (Selkirk)

North and Midlands:
Glasgow District:

=== Round 6 ===
28 December 1985

Edinburgh District	10 – 7	Glasgow District
	Report

Murrayfield Stadium
Referee: K. W. McCartney (Hawick)

Edinburgh District:
Glasgow District:

28 December 1985

Anglo-Scots	13 – 16	South
	Report

Murrayfield Stadium
Referee: R. J. Megson (Edinburgh Wanderers)

Anglo-Scots:
South of Scotland:

== Matches outwith the Championship ==
=== Other Scottish matches ===
1 March 1986

Combined Scottish Districts	19 - 21	South of Scotland District
	Report

Murrayfield Stadium
Referee: K. W. McCartney (Hawick)

Combined Scottish Districts:
South of Scotland:

=== Trial matches ===
4 January 1986

Blues Trial	10 - 41	Reds Trial
	Report

Murrayfield Stadium
Referee: J. B. Anderson (Corstrophine)

Blues:
Reds:
