= 1971–72 Scottish Inter-District Championship =

Rugby union competition

- Countries: Scotland
- Date: 1971–72
- Champions: Edinburgh District
- Runners-up: Glasgow District
- Matches played: 7

The 1971–72 Scottish Inter-District Championship was a rugby union competition for Scotland's district teams.

This season saw the 19th Scottish Inter-District Championship.

Edinburgh District won the competition after defeating Glasgow District in a play-off.

== 1971-72 League Table ==
Team	P	W	D	L	PF	PA	+/-	Pts
Glasgow District	3	2	0	1	52	43	+9	4
Edinburgh District	3	2	0	1	42	36	+6	4
South	3	1	0	2	54	32	+22	2
North and Midlands	3	1	0	2	28	65	-37	2

== Results ==
Date	Try	Conversion	Penalty	Dropped goal	Goal from mark	Notes
1971–1977	4 points	2 points	3 points	3 points	3 points	

=== Round 1 ===
27 October 1971

Edinburgh District	13 – 12	South
	Preview; Report

Meadowbank Stadium
Attendance: 5000
Referee: Alan Hosie (Hillhead HSFP)

Edinburgh District:
South:

=== Round 2 ===
6 November 1971

North and Midlands	21 – 6	Glasgow District
	Preview; Report

Rubislaw Playing Fields, Aberdeen
Referee: R. F. King (Portobello F. P.)

North and Midlands:
Glasgow District:

=== Round 3 ===
24 November 1971

Glasgow District	12 – 10	South
	Preview; Report; Report

Hughenden Stadium
Referee: D. W. G. Gray (Gordonians)

Glasgow District:
South:

=== Round 4 ===
4 December 1971

Glasgow District	24 – 12	Edinburgh District
	Preview; Report

Hughenden Stadium
Referee: T. F. E. Grierson (Hawick)

Glasgow District:
Edinburgh District:

4 December 1971

South	32 – 7	North and Midlands
	Preview; Report

The Greenyards, Melrose
Referee: M. H. Titcombe (Bristol)

South:
North and Midlands:

=== Round 5 ===
22 January 1972

North and Midlands	0 – 17	Edinburgh District
	Preview; Report

Murrayfield Stadium
Referee: W. K. Burrell (Gala)

North and Midlands:
Edinburgh District:

=== Play-off ===
4 April 1972

Edinburgh District	20 – 16	Glasgow District
	Preview; Preview; Report

Murrayfield Stadium
Referee: T. F. E. Grierson (Hawick)

Edinburgh District:
Glasgow District:

== Matches outwith the Championship ==
=== Trial matches ===
18 December 1971

Blues Trial	31 – 16	Whites Trial
	Preview; Report

Murrayfield Stadium
Referee: J. Young (Heriots)

Blues Trial:
Whites Trial:
