= 1960–61 Scottish Inter-District Championship =

Rugby union competition

- Countries: Scotland
- Date: 1960–61
- Champions: Edinburgh
- Runners-up: South
- Matches played: 6

The 1960–61 Scottish Inter-District Championship was a rugby union competition for Scotland's district teams.

This season saw the eighth formal Scottish Inter-District Championship.

Edinburgh District won the competition with three wins.

== 1960-61 League Table ==
Team	P	W	D	L	PF	PA	+/-	Pts
Edinburgh District	3	3	0	0	43	14	+29	6
South	3	2	0	1	51	31	+20	4
North and Midlands	3	1	0	2	35	45	-10	2
Glasgow District	3	0	0	3	14	53	-39	0

== Results ==
Date	Try	Conversion	Penalty	Dropped goal	Goal from mark	Notes
1948–1970	3 points	2 points	3 points	3 points	3 points	

=== Round 1 ===
15 October 1960

Glasgow District	6 – 20	South
	Preview; Report

Westerlands
Referee: D. C. J. McMahon (Heriots FP)

Glasgow District:
South:

=== Round 2 ===
5 November 1960

South	26 – 8	North and Midlands
	Preview; Report

Netherdale, Galashiels
Referee: J. A. Cessford (Hillhead HSFP)

South:
North and Midlands:

=== Round 3 ===
26 November 1960

Edinburgh District	14 – 6	North and Midlands
	Preview; Report

Murrayfield Stadium

Edinburgh District:
North and Midlands:

=== Round 4 ===
3 December 1960

Glasgow District	3 – 12	Edinburgh District
	Preview; Report

Hughenden Stadium
Referee: R. P. Burrell (Gala)

Glasgow District:
Edinburgh District:

=== Round 5 ===
14 January 1961

Edinburgh District	17 – 5	South
	Preview; Report

Greenyards, Melrose
Referee: G. K. Rome (Glasgow Academicals)

Edinburgh District:
South:

=== Round 6 ===
18 February 1961

North and Midlands	21 – 5	Glasgow District
Try: A. Bryce x 2 G. P. Hill x 2 A. G. D. Whyte; Con: J. C. Craig x 3	Preview; Report	Try: P. M. Connolly; Con: D. D. M. McGavin

North Inch, Perth
Referee: J. R. Hunter (Stewart's College)

North and Midlands: J. C. Craig (Harris Academy FP) [captain], D. J. Whyte (St. Andrews University), I. R. McDonald (Aberdeen GSFP),
J. Coletta (Gordonians), A. Bryce (Dunfermline), W. M. Johnston (Dunfermline), L. G. McCrae (Gordonians), G. P. Hill (Gordonians),
A. G. D. Whyte (Gordonians), A. Fraser (Perthshire Academicals), M. G. H. Gibb (Aberdeen GSFP), J. Steven (Madras College FP),
R. Steven (Howe of Fife), R. J. C. Glasgow (Dunfermline)
Glasgow District: M. R. McKechnie (Greenock Wanderers), Charlie Hodgson (Glasgow HSFP), D. A. C. Montgomery (Glasgow Academicals),
D. D. M. McGavin (Kelvinside Academicals), P. M. Connolly (Jordanhill College), J. T. Docherty (Glasgow HSFP), I. D. Beattie (Jordanhill College),
I. G. C. McLaren (Glasgow HSFP), I. Williamson (Glasgow HSFP), C. Allan (Jordanhill College), Hamish Kemp (Glasgow HSFP),
D. E. Mitchell (Greenock Wanderers), I. Cosgrove (Jordanhill College), P. H. Milne (Kelvinside Academicals), R. D. Andrews (Glasgow HSFP)
