= 1963–64 Scottish Inter-District Championship =

Rugby union competition

- Countries: Scotland
- Date: 1963–64
- Champions: South
- Matches played: 6

The 1963–64 Scottish Inter-District Championship was a rugby union competition for Scotland's district teams.

This season saw the 11th Scottish Inter-District Championship.

South won the competition with 3 wins.

== 1963-64 League Table ==
Team	P	W	D	L	PF	PA	+/-	Pts
South	3	3	0	0	25	0	+25	6
Edinburgh District	3	2	0	1	30	15	+15	4
Glasgow District	3	1	0	2	11	24	-13	2
North and Midlands	3	0	0	3	3	30	-27	0

== Results ==
Date	Try	Conversion	Penalty	Dropped goal	Goal from mark	Notes
1948–1970	3 points	2 points	3 points	3 points	3 points	

=== Round 1 ===
22 October 1963

Glasgow District	0 – 13	South
	Preview; Report

Hughenden Stadium
Referee: D. C. J. McMahon (Heriots F. P.)

Glasgow District:
South:

=== Round 2 ===
9 November 1963

Edinburgh District	22 – 0	North and Midlands
	Preview; Report

Murrayfield Stadium
Referee: J. A. H. Blake (Kilmarnock)

Edinburgh District:
North and Midlands:

=== Round 3 ===
23 November 1963

South	3 – 0	North and Midlands
	Preview; Report

Riverside Park, Jedburgh
Referee: A. W. Anderson (Glasgow HSFP)

South:
North and Midlands:

=== Round 4 ===
7 December 1963

Glasgow District	6 – 8	Edinburgh District
	Preview; Report

Hughenden Stadium
Referee: R. P. Burrell (Gala)

Glasgow District:
Edinburgh District:

=== Round 5 ===
21 January 1963

South	9 – 0	Edinburgh District
	Preview; Report

Poynder Park, Kelso
Referee: D. McIntyre (Glasgow HSFP)

South:
Edinburgh District:

=== Round 6 ===
15 February 1963

North and Midlands	3 – 5	Glasgow District
	Preview; Report

Linksfield Stadium, Aberdeen
Referee: T. E. Grierson (Hawick)

North and Midlands:
Glasgow District:

== Matches outwith the Championship ==
=== Trial matches ===
14 December 1963

Blues Trial	3 - 13	Whites Trial
	Preview; Report

Blues Trial:
Whites Trial:

28 December 1963

Scotland Probables	11 - 31	Scotland Possibles
	Preview; Report

Scotland Probables:
Scotland Possibles:
