= 1967–68 Scottish Inter-District Championship =

Rugby union competition

- Countries: Scotland
- Date: 1967–68
- Champions: Edinburgh District / South / Glasgow District
- Runners-up: North and Midlands
- Matches played: 6

The 1967–68 Scottish Inter-District Championship was a rugby union competition for Scotland's district teams.

This season saw the 15th Scottish Inter-District Championship.

Edinburgh District, South and Glasgow District shared the competition with 2 wins and a loss each.

== 1967-68 League Table ==
Team	P	W	D	L	PF	PA	+/-	Pts
Edinburgh District	3	2	0	1	48	25	+23	4
South	3	2	0	1	53	32	+21	4
Glasgow District	3	2	0	1	31	29	+2	4
North and Midlands	3	0	0	3	21	67	-46	0

== Results ==
Date	Try	Conversion	Penalty	Dropped goal	Goal from mark	Notes
1948–1970	3 points	2 points	3 points	3 points	3 points	

=== Round 1 ===
24 October 1967

Glasgow District	17 – 14	South
	Preview; Report

Hughenden Stadium
Referee: C. E. Allerdyce (Harris Academy F. P.)

Glasgow District:
South:

=== Round 2 ===
4 November 1967

Edinburgh District	33 – 6	North and Midlands
	Preview; Report

Murrayfield Stadium
Referee: C. Durend (France)

Edinburgh District:
North and Midlands:

=== Round 3 ===
14 November 1967

Glasgow District	5 – 9	Edinburgh District
	Preview; Report

Hughenden Stadium
Referee: M. H. Titcombe (Bristol)

Glasgow District:
Edinburgh District:

=== Round 4 ===
18 November 1967

North and Midlands	9 – 25	South
	Preview; Report

North Inch, Perth
Referee: R. F. King (Portobello F. P.)

North and Midlands:
South:

=== Round 5 ===
23 January 1968

South	14 – 6	Edinburgh District
	Preview; Report

Poynder Park, Kelso
Referee: R. Waddell (Glasgow Academicals)

South:
Edinburgh District:

=== Round 6 ===
10 February 1968

North and Midlands	6 – 9	Glasgow District
	Preview; Report

Murrayfield Stadium
Referee: J. young (Heriot's F. P.)

North and Midlands:
Glasgow District:
