= 1993–94 Scottish Inter-District Championship =

Rugby union competition

- Countries: Scotland
- Champions: South
- Runners-up: Glasgow District
- Matches played: 4

The 1993–94 Scottish Inter-District Championship rugby union Scottish Inter-District Championship saw a change in format from the usual league format to a cup competition. The Anglo-Scots district did not compete in this year's championship.

== 1993-94 league table ==
League table listed for completeness showing points scored.

| Team | P | W | D | L | PF | PA | +/- | Pts |
|---|---|---|---|---|---|---|---|---|
| South | 2 | 2 | 0 | 0 | 65 | 27 | +38 | - |
| Glasgow District | 2 | 1 | 0 | 1 | 35 | 34 | +1 | - |
| Edinburgh District | 2 | 1 | 0 | 1 | 34 | 46 | -12 | - |
| North and Midlands | 2 | 0 | 0 | 2 | 38 | 65 | -27 | - |

== Results ==
| Date | Try | Conversion | Penalty | Dropped goal | Goal from mark | Notes |
|---|---|---|---|---|---|---|
| 1992–present | 5 points | 2 points | 3 points | 3 points | — | |

=== Semi-finals ===
23 October 1993

| Glasgow District | 21 – 6 | Edinburgh District |

Hughenden Stadium

23 October 1993

| South | 37 – 13 | North and Midlands |

Riverside Park, Jedburgh

=== Third place play off ===
30 October 1993

| Edinburgh District | 28 – 25 | North and Midlands |

The Greenyards, Melrose

=== The final ===
30 October 1993

| South | 28 – 14 | Glasgow District |

The Greenyards, Melrose

== Matches outwith the championship ==
=== Trial matches ===
3 January 1994

| Blues Trial | 24 - 14 | Reds Trial |
| | Report |

Murrayfield Stadium

Blues:
Reds:

=== Irish matches ===
15 October 1993

| Leinster | 29 - 17 | Scottish Exiles |
| | Report |

Lansdowne Road

Leinster:
Scottish Exiles:
