= 1990–91 Scottish Inter-District Championship =

Rugby union competition

- Countries: Scotland
- Champions: South
- Runners-up: Glasgow District
- Matches played: 10

The 1990–91 rugby union Scottish Inter-District Championship

== 1990-91 League Table ==
Team	P	W	D	L	PF	PA	+/-	Pts
South	4	3	1	0	103	42	+61	7
Glasgow District	4	2	1	1	54	59	-5	5
Edinburgh District	4	1	2	1	63	70	-7	4
Anglo-Scots	4	1	0	3	35	55	-20	2
North and Midlands	4	1	0	3	48	77	-29	2

== Results ==
Date	Try	Conversion	Penalty	Dropped goal	Goal from mark	Notes
1977–1991	4 points	2 points	3 points	3 points	—	

=== Round 1 ===
24 November 1990

Edinburgh District	18 – 18	Glasgow District
	Report

Goldenacre Sports Ground

24 November 1990

North and Midlands	6 – 31	South of Scotland
	Report

University Park, St. Andrews

=== Round 2 ===
1 December 1990

South of Scotland	–	Anglo-Scots
	Preview

Mansfield Park, Hawick

1 December 1990

North and Midlands	15 – 22	Edinburgh District
	Preview; Report

Seafield, Aberdeen

=== Round 3 ===
8 December 1990

Edinburgh District	v	Anglo-Scots
	Report

Myreside

8 December 1990

Glasgow District	–	North and Midlands
	Report

Millbrae

=== Round 4 ===
15 December 1990

Anglo-Scots	–	North and Midlands

Iffley, Road, Oxford

15 December 1990

Glasgow District	–	South of Scotland

Hughenden Stadium

=== Round 5 ===
29 December 1990

South of Scotland	–	Edinburgh District

The Greenyards, Melrose

29 December 1990

Anglo-Scots	–	Glasgow District

Athletic Ground, Richmond

== Matches outwith the Championship ==
=== Trial matches ===
5 January 1991

Blues Trial	10 - 10	Reds Trial
Try: Craig Chalmers; Pen: Peter Dods x 2	Report	Try: Kenny Milne; Pen: Gavin Hastings x 2

Murrayfield Stadium
Referee: Jim Fleming

Blues:
Reds:
