= 1965–66 Scottish Inter-District Championship =

Rugby union competition

- Countries: Scotland
- Date: 1965–66
- Champions: South
- Runners-up: Edinburgh District
- Matches played: 6

The 1965–66 Scottish Inter-District Championship was a rugby union competition for Scotland's district teams.

This season saw the 13th Scottish Inter-District Championship.

South won the competition with 3 wins.

== 1965-66 League Table ==
Team	P	W	D	L	PF	PA	+/-	Pts
South	3	3	0	0	37	22	+15	6
Edinburgh District	3	2	0	1	32	11	+21	4
North and Midlands	3	1	0	2	26	30	-4	2
Glasgow District	3	0	0	3	14	46	-32	0

== Results ==
Date	Try	Conversion	Penalty	Dropped goal	Goal from mark	Notes
1948–1970	3 points	2 points	3 points	3 points	3 points	

=== Round 1 ===
26 October 1965

Glasgow District	11 – 14	South
	Preview; Report

Hughenden Stadium
Referee: C. E. Allerdyce (Harris Academy F. P.)

South:
Glasgow District:

=== Round 2 ===
6 November 1965

North and Midlands	11 – 15	South
	Preview; Report

Linksfield Stadium, Aberdeen
Referee: D. McIntyre (Glasgow HSFP)

North and Midlands:
South:

=== Round 3 ===
20 November 1965

Edinburgh District	15 – 0	North and Midlands
	Preview; Report

Murrayfield Stadium
Referee: D. C. J. McMahon (Heriots F. P.)

Edinburgh District:
North and Midlands:

=== Round 4 ===
4 December 1965

Glasgow District	3 – 17	Edinburgh District
	Preview; Report

Murrayfield Stadium
Referee: H. B. Laidlaw (Hawick)

Glasgow District:
Edinburgh District:

=== Round 5 ===
22 January 1966

South	8 – 0	Edinburgh District
	Preview; Report

Murrayfield Stadium
Referee: D. McIntyre (Glasgow HSFP)

South:
Edinburgh District:

=== Round 6 ===
12 March 1966

North and Midlands	15 – 0	Glasgow District
	Preview; Preview; Report

Duffus Park, Cupar
Referee: T. F. E. Grierson (Hawick)

North and Midlands:
Glasgow District:
