= 1970–71 Scottish Inter-District Championship =

Rugby union competition

- Countries: Scotland
- Date: 1970–71
- Champions: South
- Runners-up: Glasgow District
- Matches played: 5

The 1970–71 Scottish Inter-District Championship was a rugby union competition for Scotland's district teams.

This season saw the 18th Scottish Inter-District Championship.

South won the competition with 3 wins.

== 1970-71 League Table ==
Team	P	W	D	L	PF	PA	+/-	Pts
South	3	3	0	0	33	18	+15	6
Glasgow District	2	1	0	1	29	28	+1	2
Edinburgh District	3	1	0	2	44	49	-5	2
North and Midlands	2	0	0	2	20	31	-11	0

== Results ==
Date	Try	Conversion	Penalty	Dropped goal	Goal from mark	Notes
1948–1970	3 points	2 points	3 points	3 points	3 points	

=== Round 1 ===
28 October 1970

South	12 – 9	Glasgow District
	Preview; Report

Poynder Park, Kelso
Referee: D. C. J. McMahon (Heriot's F.P)

South:
Glasgow District:

=== Round 2 ===
7 November 1970

Edinburgh District	22 – 17	North and Midlands
	Preview; Report

Inverleith, Edinburgh
Referee: D. M. Davies (Swansea)

Edinburgh District:
North and Midlands:

=== Round 3 ===
21 November 1970

North and Midlands	3 – 9	South
	Preview; Report

Seafield, Aberdeen
Referee: Alan Hosie (Hillhead HSFP)

South:
North and Midlands:

=== Round 4 ===
5 December 1970

Glasgow District	20 – 16	Edinburgh District
	Preview; Report

Hughenden Stadium
Referee: M. J. Barry (Munster)

Glasgow District:
Edinburgh District:

=== Round 5 ===
27 January 1971

South	12 – 6	Edinburgh District
	Preview; Report

Poynder Park, Kelso
Referee: F. Parker (Stirling County)

South:
Edinburgh District:

=== Round 6 ===
cancelled after 2 postponements

Glasgow District	– -	North and Midlands

Glasgow District:
North and Midlands:

== Matches outwith the Championship ==
=== Other Scottish matches ===
25 November 1970

Edinburgh District	5 – 3	Anglo-Scots
	Report

Meadowbank Stadium
Referee: R. F. Johnson (Kent)

Edinburgh District:
Anglo-Scots:
