= 1991–92 Scottish Inter-District Championship =

Rugby union competition

- Countries: Scotland
- Champions: None
- Runners-up: None
- Matches played: 6

The 1991–92 rugby union Scottish Inter-District Championship was a curtailed rugby union championship.

Unusually, six teams competed in this year's tournament. Glasgow District, Edinburgh District, South, North and Midlands and the Anglo Scots were joined by a SRU Presidents XV side.

Each team played only two matches. No winner was declared.

== 1991-92 League Table ==
The league table is shown for completeness.

Team	P	W	D	L	PF	PA	+/-	Pts
South	2	2	0	0	63	7	+56	4
SRU Presidents XV	2	1	0	1	39	16	+23	2
North and Midlands	2	1	0	1	15	23	-8	2
Glasgow District	2	1	0	1	20	34	-14	2
Edinburgh District	2	1	0	1	21	44	-23	2
Anglo Scots	2	0	0	2	16	50	-34	0

== Results ==
Date	Try	Conversion	Penalty	Dropped goal	Goal from mark	Notes
1992–present	5 points	2 points	3 points	3 points	—	

=== Round 1 ===
14 September 1991

South	31 – 4	Glasgow District

Philiphaugh Stadium

South:
Glasgow District:

14 September 1991

Edinburgh District	18 – 12	Anglo-Scots

Inverleith

Edinburgh District:
Anglo-Scots:

14 September 1991

North and Midlands	12 – 7	Presidents XV

McKane Park

North and Midlands:
Presidents XV:

=== Round 2 ===
21 September 1991

Presidents XV	32 – 4	Anglo-Scots

Murrayfield Stadium

Presidents XV:
Anglo-Scots:

21 September 1991

North and Midlands	3 – 16	Glasgow District

Bridgehaugh Park

North and Midlands:
Glasgow District:

21 September 1991

South	32 – 3	Edinburgh District

Netherdale

South:
Edinburgh District:

== Matches outwith the Championship ==
=== Trial matches ===
4 January 1992

Blues Trial	18 - 27	Reds Trial
	Report

Murrayfield Stadium

Blues:
Reds:
