= 1975–76 Scottish Inter-District Championship =

Rugby union competition

- Countries: Scotland
- Date: 1975–76
- Champions: South / Glasgow District / Edinburgh District
- Matches played: 6

The 1975–76 Scottish Inter-District Championship was a rugby union competition for Scotland's district teams.

This season saw the 23rd Scottish Inter-District Championship.

South, Glasgow District and Edinburgh District shared the competition with 2 wins and 1 loss.

== 1975-76 League Table ==
Team	P	W	D	L	PF	PA	+/-	Pts
South	3	2	0	1	56	32	+24	4
Glasgow District	3	2	0	1	47	34	+13	4
Edinburgh District	3	2	0	1	38	34	+4	4
North and Midlands	3	0	0	3	20	61	-41	0

== Results ==
Date	Try	Conversion	Penalty	Dropped goal	Goal from mark	Notes
1971–1977	4 points	2 points	3 points	3 points	3 points	

=== Round 1 ===
24 January 1976

South	20 – 6	North and Midlands
	Report

Murrayfield Stadium
Referee: E. N. Sheret (Howe of Fife)

South:
North and Midlands:

== Matches outwith the Championship ==
=== Trial matches ===
20 December 1975

Blues Trial	-	Whites Trial
	Preview

Murrayfield Stadium

Blues:
Whites:
