= 1958–59 Scottish Inter-District Championship =

Rugby union competition

- Countries: Scotland
- Date: 1958–59
- Champions: South / Edinburgh
- Runners-up: North and Midlands
- Matches played: 6

The 1958–59 Scottish Inter-District Championship was a rugby union competition for Scotland's district teams.

This season saw the sixth formal Scottish Inter-District Championship.

South and Edinburgh District won the competition with two wins and a loss each.

== 1958-59 League Table ==
Team	P	W	D	L	PF	PA	+/-	Pts
South	3	2	0	1	37	13	+24	4
Edinburgh District	3	2	0	1	20	24	-4	4
North and Midlands	3	1	0	2	14	18	-4	2
Glasgow District	3	1	0	2	14	30	-16	2

== Results ==
Date	Try	Conversion	Penalty	Dropped goal	Goal from mark	Notes
1948–1970	3 points	2 points	3 points	3 points	3 points	

=== Round 1 ===
18 October 1958

Glasgow District	0 – 18	South
	Preview; Report

Referee: J. I. Morrison (Edinburgh)

Glasgow District:
South:

=== Round 2 ===
1 November 1958

North and Midlands	5 – 3	South
	Preview; Report

Referee: J. A. D. Anderson (Fettesian-Lorrettonian)

North and Midlands:
South:

=== Round 3 ===
15 November 1958

Edinburgh District	6 – 3	North and Midlands
	Preview; Report

Referee: C. W. R. Andrew (Glasgow Academicals)

Edinburgh District:
North and Midlands:

=== Round 4 ===
20 December 1958

Glasgow District	5 – 6	Edinburgh District
	Preview; Report

Referee: H. B. Laidlaw (Hawick)

Glasgow District:
Edinburgh District:

=== Round 5 ===
18 February 1959

Edinburgh District	8 – 16	South
	Preview; Report

Referee: J. A. Cessford (Hillhead HSFP)

Edinburgh District:
South:

=== Round 6 ===
7 April 1959

North and Midlands	6 – 9	Glasgow District
	Preview; Report

Referee: J. I. Morrison (Stewart's College F.P.)

North and Midlands:
Glasgow District:
