= North and Midlands =

Amateur rugby union team

Scotland
- Full name: North and Midlands District / Caledonia Reds
- Founded: amateur 1954; 72 years ago
- Coach: Colin Sangster
- Captain: Sean Blair
- League: Scottish Inter-District Championship
- 2022-23: 1st
- Current season

North and Midlands - and now known as Caledonia - is a select provincial amateur rugby union team that draws its players mainly from north of Scotland, roughly corresponding from around Stirling northwards.

Historically the North and Midlands team played matches against touring teams visiting Scotland from abroad, and also competed in the Scottish Inter-District Championship.

When the professional Caledonia Reds provincial side folded in 1998, the North and Midlands amateur district was resurrected and renamed Caledonia. The team played as Caledonia in three seasons of an amateur Scottish Inter-District Championship from 1999 to 2002. The amateur Scottish Inter-District Championship was revived for 2022-23 season, and the Caledonia district now plays there.

The Caledonia region also still plays at age-grade.

The Caledonia region now contributes professional players to the provincial Glasgow Warriors side.

== Formation ==
The side was essentially a combined team based on the North of Scotland and the Midlands District. Both were independent districts and played a North v Midlands trial match for selection to the North and Midlands combined team. Both North and Midlands district were merged into one district, now called Caledonia.

== Scottish Inter-District Championship ==
Although the North and Midlands combined team began earlier in periodic matches, it formally began as a de facto district in 1954 - when, after the start of the Scottish Inter-District Championship in 1953-54 season, the Midlands District complained to the Scottish Rugby Union that the North of Scotland District side which competed in that first championship had several Midlands players in its squad and that the Midlands should receive equal recognition for providing their players to the North of Scotland District team. The SRU agreed and the combined team became formally known as North and Midlands.

- North and Midlands v Edinburgh 5 November 1966 match report
- North and Midlands v Glasgow 15 November 1973 match report

== Professionalism ==
The amateur North and Midlands side evolved into the professional Caledonia Reds side in 1996; one year after rugby union allowed professionalism in 1995.

== Rebirth of the amateur district ==
The Caledonia Reds, as an amateur district, will return in the 2022–23 Amateur Scottish Inter-District Championship. Its Head Coach will be Colin Sangster of Dundee Rugby, aided by assistant coaches Kev Wyness (Highland/GHA), Junior Bulumakau (Highland), and Sam Mountain (Gordonians).

Sangster noted:

I am delighted to have been given the opportunity to coach the Caley Reds on their return to the Inter-district Championship. In years gone, this competition has been a highlight in the rugby calendar for players throughout the region, and the return of the event is a great opportunity for amateur club players to showcase what they can do. It’s a step up from league rugby and something for all players to aspire to.

== Honours ==
It shared the Scottish Inter-District Championship two times:- in 1959 - 60 season (with Edinburgh District and South); and in 1974 -75 season (with Glasgow District).

=== Season standings ===
==== Scottish Inter-District Championship ====
Although Midlands players were used in North's side in 1953-54, there was no formal recognition in that season. Following an upheld complaint by Midlands to the SRU, the renamed side North and Midlands competed in the 1954-55 championship onwards.

For North and Midlands professional championship results from 1996 see Caledonia Reds.

Scottish Inter-District Championship

| Season | Pos | Pld | W | D | L | F | A | +/- | BP | Pts | Notes |
|---|---|---|---|---|---|---|---|---|---|---|---|
| 1954–55 | 4th | 3 | 0 | 0 | 3 | 11 | 48 | -37 | - | 0 | |
| 1955–56 | 3rd | 3 | 1 | 0 | 2 | 17 | 41 | -24 | - | 2 | |
| 1956–57 | 3rd | 3 | 1 | 1 | 1 | 22 | 30 | -8 | - | 3 | |
| 1957–58 | 4th | 3 | 0 | 0 | 3 | 17 | 73 | -56 | - | 0 | |
| 1958–59 | 3rd | 3 | 2 | 0 | 1 | 14 | 18 | -4 | - | 2 | |
| 1959–60 | 1st= | 3 | 2 | 0 | 1 | 32 | 23 | +9 | - | 4 | Shared with South and Edinburgh |
| 1960–61 | 3rd | 3 | 1 | 0 | 2 | 35 | 45 | -10 | - | 2 | |
| 1961–62 | 3rd | 3 | 1 | 0 | 2 | 23 | 29 | -6 | - | 2 | |
| 1962–63 | 4th | 3 | 0 | 0 | 3 | 9 | 49 | -40 | - | 0 | |
| 1963–64 | 4th | 3 | 0 | 0 | 3 | 3 | 30 | -27 | - | 0 | |
| 1964–65 | 3rd | 3 | 1 | 0 | 2 | 29 | 37 | -8 | - | 2 | |
| 1965–66 | 3rd | 3 | 1 | 0 | 2 | 26 | 30 | -4 | - | 2 | |
| 1966–67 | 2nd | 3 | 2 | 0 | 1 | 30 | 27 | +3 | - | 4 | |
| 1967–68 | 4th | 3 | 0 | 0 | 3 | 21 | 67 | -46 | - | 0 | |
| 1968–69 | 4th | 3 | 0 | 1 | 2 | 27 | 39 | -12 | - | 1 | |
| 1969–70 | 3rd | 3 | 1 | 0 | 2 | 30 | 47 | -17 | - | 2 | |
| 1970–71 | 4th | 2 | 0 | 0 | 2 | 20 | 31 | -11 | - | 0 | Glasgow match cancelled |
| 1971–72 | 4th | 3 | 1 | 0 | 2 | 28 | 65 | -37 | - | 2 | |
| 1972–73 | 3rd | 3 | 1 | 0 | 2 | 45 | 48 | -3 | - | 2 | |
| 1973–74 | 3rd | 3 | 1 | 0 | 2 | 34 | 38 | -4 | - | 2 | |
| 1974–75 | 1st= | 3 | 2 | 0 | 1 | 36 | 26 | +10 | - | 4 | Shared with Glasgow |
| 1975–76 | 4th | 3 | 0 | 0 | 3 | 20 | 61 | -41 | - | 0 | |
| 1976–77 | 3rd | 3 | 1 | 0 | 2 | 54 | 86 | +32 | - | 2 | |
| 1977–78 | 4th | 3 | 0 | 0 | 3 | 7 | 86 | -79 | - | 0 | |
| 1978–79 | 4th | 3 | 0 | 0 | 3 | 23 | 64 | -41 | - | 0 | |
| 1979–80 | 4th | 3 | 0 | 0 | 3 | 19 | 151 | -132 | - | 0 | |
| 1980–81 | 4th | 3 | 0 | 0 | 3 | 9 | 118 | -109 | - | 0 | |
| 1981–82 | 5th | 3 | 0 | 0 | 3 | 29 | 79 | -50 | - | 0 | Match with Anglo-Scots invalid |
| 1982–83 | 5th | 4 | 0 | 0 | 4 | 31 | 136 | -105 | - | 0 | |
| 1983–84 | 5th | 4 | 0 | 0 | 4 | 28 | 149 | -121 | - | 0 | |
| 1984–85 | 4th | 4 | 1 | 0 | 3 | 40 | 103 | -63 | - | 2 | |
| 1985–86 | 5th | 4 | 0 | 0 | 4 | 28 | 116 | -88 | - | 0 | |
| 1986–87 | 5th | 4 | 0 | 0 | 4 | 29 | 104 | -75 | - | 0 | |
| 1987–88 | 5th | 4 | 0 | 0 | 4 | 50 | 141 | -91 | - | 0 | |
| 1988–89 | 5th | 4 | 0 | 0 | 4 | 27 | 81 | -54 | - | 0 | |
| 1989–90 | 5th | 4 | 0 | 0 | 4 | 47 | 82 | -35 | - | 0 | |
| 1990–91 | 5th | 4 | 1 | 0 | 3 | 48 | 77 | -29 | - | 2 | |
| 1991–92 | 3rd | 2 | 1 | 0 | 1 | 15 | 23 | -8 | - | 2 | Abbreviated tournament - no winner |
| 1992–93 | 3rd | 4 | 2 | 0 | 2 | 60 | 101 | -41 | - | 4 | |
| 1993–94 | 4th | 2 | 0 | 0 | 2 | 38 | 65 | -27 | - | - | |
| 1994–95 | 3rd | 4 | 1 | 1 | 2 | 69 | 84 | -15 | - | 3 | |
| 1995–96 | 3rd | 4 | 2 | 0 | 2 | 95 | 72 | +23 | - | 4 | |

===== Professional Era =====
The Amateur Scottish Inter-District Championship has been restarted twice in the professional era. The first restart was from 1999 to 2002; the second restart from the 2022-23 season.

| Season | Pos | Pld | W | D | L | F | A | +/- | BP | Pts | Notes |
|---|---|---|---|---|---|---|---|---|---|---|---|
| 1999–2000 | 1st | 3 | 3 | 0 | 0 | 113 | 79 | +34 | 3 | 15 | |
| 2000–01 | 5th | 4 | 0 | 0 | 4 | 69 | 92 | -23 | 4 | 4 | |
| 2001–02 | 4th | 4 | 1 | 0 | 3 | 77 | 99 | -22 | 2 | 6 | |
| 2022–23 | 1st | 2 | 2 | 0 | 0 | 90 | 57 | 33 | 2 | 10 | |

== Partial list of games played against international opposition ==
| Year | Date | Opponent | Venue | Result | Score | Tour |
|---|---|---|---|---|---|---|
| 1978 | 5 December | New Zealand | Aberdeen | Loss | 3-31 | 1978 New Zealand tour of Britain & Ireland Report |
| 1981 | 15 December | Australia | Aberdeen | Loss | 3–36 | 1981–82 Australia tour of Britain & Ireland |
| 1986 | 20 September | Japan | Aberdeen | Loss | 19–27 | 1986 Japan rugby union tour of Great Britain Report |
| 1988 | 15 November | Australia | Dundee | Loss | 17-37 | 1988 Australia rugby union tour of England, Scotland and Italy |
| 1995 | 20 September | Samoa | Perth | Win | 47-14 | 1995 Western Samoa rugby union tour of Great Britain |

== See also ==
- Caledonia Reds
- The North
- Midlands District
