= 1972–73 Scottish Inter-District Championship =

Rugby union competition

- Countries: Scotland
- Date: 1972–73
- Champions: Edinburgh District
- Runners-up: Glasgow District
- Matches played: 6

The 1972–73 Scottish Inter-District Championship was a rugby union competition for Scotland's district teams.

This season saw the 20th Scottish Inter-District Championship.

Edinburgh District and Glasgow District shared the competition with 2 wins and 1 loss.

North and Midlands beat South of Scotland for the first time since 1958.

== 1972-73 League Table ==
Team	P	W	D	L	PF	PA	+/-	Pts
Edinburgh District	3	2	0	1	54	41	+13	4
Glasgow District	3	2	0	1	70	74	-4	4
North and Midlands	3	1	0	2	45	48	-3	2
South	3	1	0	2	53	59	-6	2

== Results ==
Date	Try	Conversion	Penalty	Dropped goal	Goal from mark	Notes
1971–1977	4 points	2 points	3 points	3 points	3 points	

=== Round 1 ===
4 November 1972

Glasgow District	19 – 18	North and Midlands
	Report

Glasgow District:
North and Midlands:

=== Round 2 ===
7 November 1972

South	16 – 6	Edinburgh District
	Report

South of Scotland:
Edinburgh District:

=== Round 3 ===
18 November 1972

Edinburgh District	30 – 19	Glasgow District
	Report

Murrayfield Stadium
Referee: T. F. E. Grierson (Hawick)

Edinburgh District:
Glasgow District:

18 November 1972

South of Scotland	11 – 21	North and Midlands
	Report

Murrayfield Stadium
Referee: W. H. Hitchhags (Wales)

South of Scotland:
North and Midlands:

=== Round 4 ===
20 January 1973

North and Midlands	6 – 18	Edinburgh District
	Report

North and Midlands:
Edinburgh District:

=== Round 5 ===
24 January 1973

South of Scotland	26 – 32	Glasgow District
	Report

South of Scotland:
Glasgow District:

== Matches outwith the Championship ==
=== Trial matches ===
30 December 1972

Scotland Probables	11 - 10	Scotland Possibles
	Preview; Preview; Preview; Report

Murrayfield Stadium
Referee: T. F. E. Grierson (Hawick)

Probables:
Possibles:
