= 1999–2000 Amateur Scottish Inter-District Championship =

Rugby union competition

- Countries: Scotland
- Champions: Caledonia
- Runners-up: Scottish Borders
- Matches played: 6

The 1999–2000 Amateur Scottish Inter-District Championship was a rugby union competition for Scotland's amateur district teams.

The professional game in Scotland saw the merging of the 4 districts into 2 in 1998; now only Glasgow Caledonians and Edinburgh Reivers were involved in the professional Scottish Inter-District Championship as a renamed Tri-Series. The Glasgow and Edinburgh sides were also involved in the Welsh-Scottish League.

"When we changed from four to two districts, the top of the tree was lopped off," Jim Telfer said.

The SRU decided to re-instate the Inter-District Championship at amateur level with the traditional amateur districts of Glasgow District, Edinburgh District, South and North and Midlands.

The North and Midlands district was renamed Caledonia to tie in with the disbanded professional side Caledonia Reds and the South district was renamed Scottish Borders to tie in with the disbanded professional side Border Reivers.

"In launching this championship I think it has put the top of the tree back and it is a chance for the best young players in the clubs to aspire to the next rung of the ladder. There is a gap between the top of the club game and the professional tier and the championship is an opportunity to try to bridge that gap."

== 1999-2000 League Table ==
Team	P	W	D	L	PF	PA	+/-	TBP	LBP	Pts
Caledonia	3	3	0	0	113	79	+34	3	0	15
Scottish Borders	3	2	0	1	112	83	+29	2	0	10
Edinburgh District	3	1	0	2	90	118	-28	1	1	6
Glasgow District	3	0	0	3	72	107	-35	2	2	4

== Results ==
=== Round 1 ===
26 April 2000
postponed to
15 May 2000
7pm

(1BP) Edinburgh District (Scotland)	37 – 35	(Scotland) Glasgow District (2BP)
Try: Duncan; McCallum; McVie; Armstrong; Con: Ross x 4 Pen: Ross x 2 Drop: Ross	Report	Try: McKay; Henderson; Thomson; Price; Duffy; Con: Duffy x 2 Pen: Duffy x 2

Murrayfield Stadium
Referee: J Steele (Dumfries)

Edinburgh District: M Duncan (Currie); C Keenan (Heriot's FP), G Kiddie, L Graham (both Boroughmuir), S Walker (N Armstrong Currie 20); G Ross (both Heriot's FP), C Black (Watsonians); J Bryce (captain, Heriot's FP), L Barrett, C Black (both Currie), (D Wilson, Currie, 78), G McCallum (Boroughmuir), C Harrison (Edinburgh Accies), T McVie (Heriot's FP), N Penny (Watsonians) (O Brown, Boroughmuir, 49), E McDonald (Boroughmuir) (D Boswall, Heriot's, 18).
Glasgow District: K Baillie (Glasgow Hawks); G Thompson (West of Scotland), C Bartwicki (East Kilbride) (P Price, Hillhead/ Jordanhill, 27), A Henderson (West), R Couper (Boroughmuir); S Duffy (Ardrossan Accies), C Little (Hawks); A Cowan (Dalziel) (D Jamieson, West, 55), C Docherty (Hawks) (C di Ciacca, West, 11), A Welsh (East Kilbride), G Perrett (West), I Smith (Hawks) (A Williamson, Hutcheson's/ Aloysians, 45), P Pattenden (East Kilbride), R Niven (Hawks), R McKay (Hawks).

26 April 2000
postponed to
13 May 2000
7pm

(1BP) Caledonia (Scotland)	44 – 28	(Scotland) Scottish Borders
Try: Buchan; Sangster; Hose; Oddie; Fraser x 2 Con: Oddie x 4 Pen: Oddie x 2	Report	Try: Dickson; Turnbull; Douglas; Con: N. Stenhouse x 2 Pen: N. Stenhouse x 3

Beveridge Park
Referee: R Dickson (Madras College).

Caledonia: S Pearson (C Milne 61min); A Buchan, M McGrandles (M Fraser 49min), C Sangster, N Renton; K Oddie, A Hose; B Prescott, I Stanger (D Hall 40min), M Crossley (D Herrington 55min), J Syme, G Broomfield (C Hornibrook 40min), S Hannah, M Taylor, C MacDonald
Scottish Borders: N Stenhouse; P Rutherford (N Douglas 31min), S Paterson, A Dickson, B Ruthven; C Turnbull, R Chrystie; I Cornwall, W Mitchell, G Kerr (E Johnstone 55min), I Elliot, S Aitken, A Clark, B Keown, J Henderson

=== Round 2 ===
3 May 2000
7pm

Glasgow District (Scotland)	10 – 38	(Scotland) Scottish Borders (1BP)
Try: Scott; Con: Barrett; Pen: Barrett	Report	Try: Dickson; Cranston x 2 Keown; Aitken; Paterson; Con: Stenhouse x 4

Braidholm
Referee: Jim Fleming (Boroughmuir)

Glasgow District: K Baillie (Glasgow Hawks); M Scott (Glasgow Hawks), P Price (Hillhead/Jordanhill) repl by C Bartwicki (East Kilbride) 69 min, A Henderson (West of Scotland), R Couper (Boroughmuir); N Barrett (Glasgow Hawks), K Sinclair (Glasgow Hawks); A Cowan (Dalziel) repl by C di Ciacca (West of Scotland) 33, C Docherty (Glasgow Hawks), A Welsh (East Kilbride)repl by G Blackburn (Glasgow Southern) 24, I Smith (Glasgow Hawks), R McKay (Glasgow Hawks), N McKenzie (Hutchesons'/Aloysians) repl by C Pollock (Kilmarnock) 57, R Maxton (Stewart's-Melville FP), P Pattenden (East Kilbride)
Scottish Borders: N Stenhouse (Hawick); S Paterson (Gala), S Cranston (Hawick), A Dickson (Selkirk), B Ruthven (Melrose); K Davidson (Hawick), R Chrystie (Melrose) repl by K Reid (Hawick) 78; E Johnstone (Gala) repl by I Cornwall (Melrose) 45, M Landels (Hawick) repl by W Mitchell (Melrose) 65, G Kerr (Jed-Forest), J Bradburn (Jed- Forest) repl by S Aitken (Melrose) 45, I Elliot (Hawick), T Weir (Gala), S Jeffrey (Selkirk) repl by J Henderson (Melrose) 45, B Keown (Hawick).

3 May 2000
7pm

(1BP) Caledonia (Scotland)	37 – 24	(Scotland) Edinburgh District (1BP)
Try: Broomfield; Sangster; Hannah; Macdonald; McAllister; Con: Oddie x 3 Pen: Oddie	Report	Try: Keenan; Kiddie; Walker; Armstrong; Con: Ross x 2

Beveridge Park
Referee: C Muir (Langholm)

Caledonia: S Pearson (Dundee HSFP), A Buchan (Aberdeen GSFP), M McGrandles (Stirling County, replaced by M Fraser (Stirling County)), C Sangster (Stirling County), N Renton (Kirkcaldy, S McAllister, Kirkcaldy), K Oddie (Aberdeen GSFP), A Hose (Aberdeen GSFP, I Black, Aberdeen GSFP), C Reid (Stirling County), S Brown (Kirkcaldy), M Crossley (Grangemouth Stags), D Herrington (Kirkcaldy), J Syme (Kirkcaldy), G Broomfield (Dunfermline, C Hornibrook, Aberdeen GSFP), S Hannah (Kirkcaldy, A Brown, Dundee HSFP), M Taylor (Aberdeen GSFP), Craig McDonald (Kirkcaldy). Replacements (not used): I Stanger (Aberdeen GSFP)
Edinburgh District: G Lawson (Heriot's), C Keenan (Heriot's), L Graham (Boroughmuir), G Kiddie (Boroughmuir, N Armstrong, Currie), S Walker (Heriot's, M Duncan, Currie), G Ross (Heriot's), C Black (Watsonians, R Lawson, Heriot's), J Bryce (Heriot's), A McLean (Heriot's), C Black (Currie), D Boswall (Heriot's), G McCallum (Boroughmuir), T McVie (Heriot's, C Harrison, Edinburgh Acad), A Dall (Heriot's, E McDonald (Boroughmuir), P Simpson (Currie). Replacements (not used): D Wilson (Currie), L Barrett (Currie)

=== Round 3 ===
10 May 2000
7pm

(1BP) Scottish Borders (Scotland)	46 – 29	(Scotland) Edinburgh District
Try: Ruthven; Cranston; Landels; Paterson x 2 Con: Stenhouse x 3 Pen: Stenhouse x 5	Report	Try: G Lawson; McCallum; Barrett (80); Con: Duncan; Pen: Duncan x 4

Philiphaugh
Referee: M Stevenson (Stirling Co)

Scottish Borders: N Stenhouse (Hawick); S Paterson (Gala), S Cranston (Hawick), A Dickson (Selkirk), B Ruthven (Melrose); K Davidson (Hawick), R Chrystie; I Cornwall (both Melrose), M Landels (Hawick), E Johnstone (Gala), I Elliot (Hawick), S Aitken (Melrose), T Weir (Gala), J Henderson (Melrose), B Keown (Hawick). Subs: G. Hill (Jed-Forest) for Cranston 30 minutes; W. Mitchell (Melrose) for Landels 52 minutes; M. Murray (Selkirk) for Johnstone 65 minutes.
Edinburgh District: G Lawson; C Keenan (both Heriot's), L Graham, G Kiddie (both Boroughmuir), J Burnett (Watsonians); M Duncan (Currie), C Black (Watsonians); J Bruce (Heriot's), L Barrett, C Black (both Currie), D Boswall (Heriot's), G McCallum (Boroughmuir), T McVie (Heriot's), P Simpson (Currie), N Penny (Watsonians). M Stevenson, Stirling County. Subs: R. Lawson (Heriot's) for Keenan 46 minutes; A. Warnock (Biggar) for Burnett 32 minutes; D. Wilson (Currie) for Black 75 minutes; C. Harrison (Edinburgh Accies) for Boswall 60 minutes; E. McDonald (Boroughmuir) for Simpson 16 minutes.

10 May 2000
7.30pm

(2BP) Glasgow District (Scotland)	27 – 32	(Scotland) Caledonia (1BP)
Try: Henderson x 2 Couper; McKay. Con: Barratt; Baillie; Pen: Barratt	Report	Try: MacDonald; Buchan; Renton; Hannah; Con: Oddie x 3 Pen: Oddie x 2

Millbrae
Referee: M.McEwan (Hawick Harlequins).

Glasgow District: K Baillie; M Scott,(P Price 71) C Bartwicki, A Henderson, R Couper; N. Barrett (S. Duffy 61), Little; A Cowan, (D Jamieson 61) C Docherty, A Welsh,(C di Ciacca 61) G Perrett, R McKay, N McKenzie (RNiven52), R Pattenden, R.Maxton (A.Williamson 63).
Caledonia: S Pearson; A Buchan,(C Milne 59) M McGrandles (M Fraser 73), C Sangster, N Renton; K Oddie, A Hose I Black 77); B Prescott, S Brown (I Stanger 50), M Crossley, J Syme, G Broomfield, S Hannah, (A Brown 53) M Taylor, CMacDonald.
