= 1956–57 Scottish Inter-District Championship =

Rugby union competition

- Countries: Scotland
- Date: 1956–57
- Champions: South / Edinburgh District
- Runners-up: Glasgow District
- Matches played: 6

The 1956–57 Scottish Inter-District Championship was a rugby union competition for Scotland's district teams.

This season saw the fourth formal Scottish Inter-District Championship.

A notable selection for Glasgow District this season was that of Noel Bowden, a capped All Black from New Zealand,

South and Edinburgh District won the competition with two wins and a loss each.

== 1956-57 League Table ==
Team	P	W	D	L	PF	PA	+/-	Pts
South	3	2	0	1	46	14	+32	4
Edinburgh District	3	2	0	1	36	28	+8	4
North and Midlands	3	1	1	1	22	30	-8	3
Glasgow District	3	0	1	2	18	50	-32	1

== Results ==
Date	Try	Conversion	Penalty	Dropped goal	Goal from mark	Notes
1948–1970	3 points	2 points	3 points	3 points	3 points	

=== Round 1 ===
20 October 1956

Glasgow District	3 – 24	South
	Preview; Report

Balgray Playing Fields, Glasgow
Referee: J. Ross (Heriots)

Glasgow District:
South:

=== Round 2 ===
3 November 1956

South	8 – 11	North and Midlands
	Preview; Report

Poynder Park, Kelso
Referee: Dr. S. S. Meighan (Glasgow HSFP)

South:
North and Midlands:

=== Round 3 ===
17 November 1956

Edinburgh District	16 – 5	North and Midlands
	Preview; Report

Raeburn Place
Referee: A. M. Nicol (Glasgow Academicals)

North and Midlands:
Edinburgh District:

=== Round 4 ===
1 December 1956

Glasgow District	9 – 20	Edinburgh District
	Preview; Report

Old Anniesland
Referee: G. Burrell (Gala)

Glasgow District:
Edinburgh District:

=== Round 5 ===
19 January 1957

North and Midlands	6 – 6	Glasgow District
	Preview; Report; Report

Linksfield Park, Aberdeen

North and Midlands:
Glasgow District:

=== Round 6 ===
9 February 1957

South	14 – 0	Edinburgh District
	Preview; Report

Netherdale, Galashiels
Referee: J. A. Cessford (Hillhead HSFP)

South:
Edinburgh District:
