= John Hegarty (rugby union) =

Scotland international rugby union player

John Jackson Hegarty (13 April 1925 – 16 July 2016 (aged 91)) was a Scottish rugby union footballer of the 1950s. He played representative level rugby union for Scotland national, and at club level for Hawick RFC, as a lock.

== Playing career ==
Hegarty was capped six times between 1951–55 for Scotland (RU).

== Family ==
He was the father of Brian Hegarty, who was also capped for Scotland.
