= 1973–74 Scottish Inter-District Championship =

Rugby union competition

- Countries: Scotland
- Date: 1973–74
- Champions: Glasgow District
- Runners-up: South
- Matches played: 6

The 1973–74 Scottish Inter-District Championship was a rugby union competition for Scotland's district teams.

This season saw the 21st Scottish Inter-District Championship.

Glasgow District won the competition with 3 wins.

== 1973-74 League Table ==
Team	P	W	D	L	PF	PA	+/-	Pts
Glasgow District	3	3	0	0	44	38	+6	6
South	3	2	0	1	51	34	+17	4
North and Midlands	3	1	0	2	34	38	-4	2
Edinburgh District	3	0	0	3	19	38	-19	0

== Results ==
Date	Try	Conversion	Penalty	Dropped goal	Goal from mark	Notes
1971–1977	4 points	2 points	3 points	3 points	3 points	
