= 1966–67 Scottish Inter-District Championship =

Rugby union competition

- Countries: Scotland
- Date: 1966–67
- Champions: South
- Runners-up: North and Midlands
- Matches played: 6

The 1966–67 Scottish Inter-District Championship was a rugby union competition for Scotland's district teams.

This season saw the 14th Scottish Inter-District Championship.

South won the competition with 2 wins and a draw.

== 1966-67 League Table ==
Team	P	W	D	L	PF	PA	+/-	Pts
South	3	2	1	0	43	17	+26	5
North and Midlands	3	2	0	1	30	27	+3	4
Glasgow District	3	1	0	2	29	49	-20	2
Edinburgh District	3	0	1	2	19	28	-9	1

== Results ==
Date	Try	Conversion	Penalty	Dropped goal	Goal from mark	Notes
1948–1970	3 points	2 points	3 points	3 points	3 points	

=== Round 1 ===
25 October 1966

South	27 – 14	Glasgow District
	Preview; Report

Poynder Park, Kelso
Referee: J. Young (Heriot's F.P)

Glasgow District:
South:

=== Round 2 ===
5 November 1966

North and Midlands	16 – 8	Edinburgh District
	Preview; Report

North and Midlands:
Edinburgh District:

=== Round 3 ===
22 November 1966

Glasgow District	12 – 11	Edinburgh District
	Preview; Report

Glasgow District:
Edinburgh District:

=== Round 4 ===
26 November 1966

South	16 – 3	North and Midlands
	Preview; Report

South:
North and Midlands:

=== Round 5 ===
21 January 1967

Edinburgh District	0 – 0	South
	Preview; Report

Edinburgh District:
South:

=== Round 6 ===
11 February 1967

Glasgow District	3 – 11	North and Midlands
	Preview; Report

Glasgow District:
North and Midlands:
