= 1995 Western Samoa rugby union tour of Great Britain =

Summary
P	W	D	L
Total
12	5	1	6
Test match
2	0	1	1
Opponent
P	W	D	L
Scotland
1	0	1	0
England
1	0	0	1

The 1995 Samoa rugby union tour of Great Britain was a series of matches played in October and November 1995 in Scotland and England by the Samoa national rugby union team. The tour was made after the good results at the 1995 Rugby World Cup.

== Results ==
Scores and results list Samoa's points tally first.

Opponent	For	Against	Date	Venue	Status
Edinburgh	35	22	8 November 1995	Inverleith	Tour match
Scotland A	29	6	12 November 1995	Hawick	Tour match
North and Midlands	14	47	14 November 1995	Perth	Tour match
Scotland	15	15	18 November 1995	Murrayfield, Edinburgh	Test match
Oxford University	47	15	21 November 1995	Oxford	Tour match
Cambridge University	14	22	25 November 1995	Cambridge	Tour match
London & Southeast	40	32	29 November 1995	London	Tour match
Midlands	19	40	2 December 1995	Welford Road, Leicester	Tour match
North	8	34	5 December 1995	McAlpine, Huddersfield	Tour match
South & Southwest	31	16	9 December 1995	Kingsholm, Gloucester	Tour match
England A	0	55	12 December 1995	Gateshead International Stadium,	Tour match
England	9	27	16 December 1995	Twickenham, London	Test match
