= 1986 Japan rugby union tour of Great Britain =

Summary
P	W	D	L
Total
8	2	0	6
Test match
2	0	0	2
Opponent
P	W	D	L
England XV
1	0	0	1
Scotland XV
1	0	0	1

The 1986 Japan rugby union tour of Great Britain was a series of matches played in September-October 1986 in Great Britain by the Japan national rugby union team.

== Results ==
17 September 1986

South of Scotland	45 - 12	Japan XV

Melrose

20 September 1986

North and Midlands	19 - 27	Japan XV

Aberdeen

23 September 1986

Edinburgh	26 - 14	Japan XV

Myreside, Edinburgh

27 September 1986

Scotland XV	33 - 18	Japan

Murrayfield, Edinburgh

1 October 1986

Leicestershire Rugby Union Centenary XV	33 - 22	Japan XV

Leicester

4 October 1986

Cornwall	15 - 36	Japan XV

Camborne

7 October 1986

England Students	43 - 4	Japan XV

Oxford

11 October 1986

England XV	39 - 12	Japan

Twickenham, London
