= Glasgow District (rugby union) =

Scottish district rugby union team

- Full name: Glasgow District; Glasgow and the West
- Founded: amateur 1872; 154 years ago
- Location: Glasgow, Scotland
- Coach: Kenny Diffenthal
- Captain(s): Connor Bickerstaff; Paul Cairncross
- League: Scottish Inter-District Championship
- 2022-23: 3rd
Team kit
- Current season

Glasgow District is a Scottish amateur rugby union team which plays in the amateur Scottish Inter-District Championship. The side evolved into the professional provincial side Glasgow Warriors when the Scottish Rugby Union embraced professionalism. However the amateur district is still used for the representation of amateur players in the Inter-District Championship; and this amateur championship guides the selection of Scotland Club XV international players.

Founded in 1872 Glasgow District was a select provincial amateur rugby union team that drew its players mainly from the Greater Glasgow area, as well as others from the rest of the west of Scotland; roughly corresponding to the old Strathclyde regional council area. Historically the Glasgow District team played matches against touring teams visiting Scotland from abroad, and also competed in the Scottish Inter-District Championship.

The Glasgow District rugby union team was founded in 1872. The team played the world's first inter-district match that year against Edinburgh District rugby union team.

The amateur Glasgow District side evolved into the professional Glasgow Warriors side in 1996; one year after rugby union allowed professionalism in 1995.

== Formation ==
The Glasgow District side was formed in 1872 to play against an Edinburgh District side.

The teams met on 23 November 1872 at Burnbank Park at Woodlands in Glasgow; and Edinburgh District won 1 drop goal – 0 in a 20-a-side fixture. This is the oldest inter-district match in the world and to mark this the current Glasgow Warriors and Edinburgh Rugby sides play for the 1872 Cup every year.

The first Glasgow team in 1872:-

Backs: Thomas Chalmers (Glasgow Academicals), William Davie Brown (Glasgow Academicals),
William Hamilton Kidston (West of Scotland)
Half Backs: William Cross (Glasgow Academicals), T. A. Drew (Glasgow Academicals)
Quarters: George Buchanan McClure (West of Scotland), John Arthur (Glasgow Academicals) [Captain]
Forwards: John Kennedy Tod, Henry William Allan, Charles Chalmers Bryce, George Raphael Fleming,
J.S. Thomson, J.K. Brown (all Glasgow Academicals)
James Howe McClure, J. Kennedy, J.P. Tennant, Robert Wilson, G. Hunter, A. Cochrane (all West of Scotland)
J.W. Reid (Glasgow University)

After the initial match at Burnbank, the games rotated - in the twice a season format - between Raeburn Place in Edinburgh and Hamilton Crescent in Partick, Glasgow.

== Selection of representative players ==
Often to aid the selection process of Glasgow District's players a trial match was played.

In Glasgow's case a trial match of hopefuls were divided into Blues and Whites teams, so the players could impress the selectors.

Glasgow also played a 'Rest of the West' team for selection.

== Early history ==
=== The Inter-City ===
With the exception of the first four years, the Glasgow v Edinburgh district fixture was more or less played annually; only being beaten by World War and occasional inclement weather.

Typically the Glasgow District side, in its early history, was crammed with Scottish international players.

The Glasgow team for the 5 December 1874 match is an example:

Backs: William Davie Brown [captain] ᵜ , James Stewart Carrick ᵜ (both Glasgow Academicals)
Half Backs: Malcolm Cross ᵜ (Glasgow Academicals), William Hamilton Kidston ᵜ (West of Scotland)
Quarters: James Howe McClure ᵜ , George Buchanan McClure ᵜ (both West of Scotland),
John Kennedy Tod ᵜ (Glasgow Academicals)
Forwards: Gilbert Heron ᵜ, Charles Chalmers Bryce ᵜ , Allan Arthur ᵜ , Henry William Allan ᵜ ,
George Raphael Fleming ᵜ (all Glasgow Academicals)
Tom Paterson Neilson ᵜ , John Alexander Neilson ᵜ , J.S. Kennedy, Preston (West of Scotland)
C.E. McArthur, Henry Melville Napier ᵜ , W.B. Russell, J. Hutchison (Glasgow University)

ᵜ Marked as Scottish internationalists.

The first 15-a-side match was played on 29 January 1876.

From the Inter-City formation in 1872, Edinburgh won the first two fixtures. Six draws followed, then came sporadic Edinburgh wins and draws. It was not until the 13th inter-city tie that Glasgow won the fixture.

The first winning Glasgow side in 1881:

David Kidston (G. Academicals), A. J. W. Reid and C. W. Dunlop (West of Scotland),
John Alexander Neilson (West of Scotland) and C. Ker (G. Academicals),
D. Y. Cassels [captain], D. McGowan, A. Walker, R. Adam (West of Scotland),
R. B. Young, J. Lang (Glasgow University),
John Blair Brown, R. A. Kerr, William Andrew Walls, G. H. Robb (G. Academicals).

Glasgow then held dominance until 1887 when once more Edinburgh won again. From the 1880s to the close of the 1890s Edinburgh won a total of only four times in 20-years. The tide turned back in Edinburgh's favour in 1898. With only a solitary Glasgow win in 1905, Edinburgh held sway until 1914.

=== Hamilton Crescent, New Anniesland, Old Anniesland ===
The games were postponed during the First World War period. After around 50-years at Hamilton Crescent – the West of Scotland ground in Woodlands, Glasgow – the Glasgow v Edinburgh fixture moved to Glasgow Academical's ground at New Anniesland, Glasgow, in 1921. This move prompted yet another shift in balance as Glasgow once again became the dominant force of the two districts. The fixture moved to Glasgow HSFP's ground Old Anniesland in 1927.

=== Rugby Union ===
To coincide with the Scottish Football Union changing its name to the Scottish Rugby Union in 1924, the SRU made the Glasgow District Union into the Glasgow District Rugby Union that same year.

== Touring sides ==
Glasgow often played matches against international and non-international touring teams. Occasionally both Glasgow and Edinburgh would field joint teams against the international touring teams.

One strange example is that of the New South Wales Waratahs world tour in 1927–28. They played against Glasgow District on 12 October 1927. Due to collapse of the Queensland Rugby Union they effectively were a de facto Australian national rugby team at the time and the Australian Rugby Union have decreed that their international matches of that tour should be taken as full tests. In the match against Glasgow, the Waratahs won 10–0.

== Scottish Inter-District Championship ==
Two other Scottish districts South and North and Midlands had also been formed and there was regular matches between the four Scottish districts as well as against the touring sides.

The Scottish Inter-District Championship was established in the 1953–54 season. The Glasgow, Edinburgh, South and North and Midlands sides would play off to see which district was best in Scotland. From 1981 an Anglo-Scots or Scottish Exiles team was also invited into this championship.

- Glasgow v South 23 October 1973 match report
- Glasgow v North and Midlands 4 January 1975 match report

Famously the 1989 Glasgow District side went through the entire 1989–90 season undefeated:- winning the Scottish Inter-District Championship outright; drawing 18–18 with Munster away; winning 21–6 against Connacht away; and winning against Fiji

Glasgow Inter-District Championship-winning squad 1989–1990.

Graeme Smillie (Glasgow Academicals)

Dave Barrett, Matt Duncan, Dave McKee (West of Scotland), Ian Jardine, George Graham, Kevin McKenzie, Brian Robertson, Stewart Hamilton (all Stirling County), Derek Stark, Phil Manning, David McVey (Ayr), George Breckenridge, Ewan McCorkindale, Alan Watt, Shade Munro, Fergus Wallace, Derek Busby (all Glasgow High Kelvinside), Stewart McAslan (Glasgow Academicals), David Jackson (Hillhead Jordanhill).

=== Age grades ===
The Scottish Inter-District Championship was also contested at Age Grade level. The Under 21 Glasgow District side won for the first time in 1986–87 season. With players like Shade Munro, Andrew Garry, Gordon Mackay, Gerry Hawkes and Murray Wallace in that side, it gave a good foundation for the 1989–90 season triumph and these young players later went on to represent the fledgling professional Glasgow side.

== Effect of professionalism ==
With the advent of professionalism in 1995, the Scottish Rugby Union realised that not even the best semi-professional Scottish club teams could compete in the new Professional Era in rugby union, which was beginning to gain great momentum in the professional leagues of the Southern Hemisphere and the Northern Hemisphere.

In an attempt to stay in touch with the leading nations the SRU formed four professional teams out of the four amateur districts of Scotland in 1996. It was these newly professional teams that would represent Scotland in the Heineken Cup and in the Celtic League. The amateur Glasgow District side was to become the professional Glasgow Warriors side.

For the subsequent history of the professional Glasgow rugby district team from 1996, see Glasgow Warriors.

== Rebirth of the amateur district ==
Glasgow District, or Glasgow and the West, as an amateur district, will return in the 2022–23 Amateur Scottish Inter-District Championship. Its Head Coach will be Kenny Diffenthal of Marr Rugby, aided by assistant coaches Thomas Davidson (Glasgow Hawks) and Stephen Adair (Marr).

Diffenthal noted:

It is indeed a great honour and privilege to be selected as Head Coach of Glasgow and the West. Looking ahead, it’s going to be a tough competition, entering the unknown mixing clubs and coaches, but it is an exciting challenge and a great opportunity to bring together talented players from across the District. I have a great team with Thomas and Stephen assisting me and we are looking forward to working closely together to build a strong squad.

== Records and achievements ==
=== Honours ===
The Glasgow District won the Scottish Inter-District Championship outright in 1955–56, 1973–74 and 1989–90.

It also shared the Scottish Inter-District Championship six times: 1964–65, 1967–68, 1972–73, 1974–75, 1975–76 and 1977–78.

=== Season standings ===
==== Inter-City ====
Inter-City	No Inter-City played

Glasgow score given first. ᵜ Previous to 1876 only goals counted; tries were ignored in the result.

Scoreline key:

Glasgow win	Edinburgh win	Draw

===== Twice a season matches =====
Season	Date	Score	Report	Notes	Date	Score	Report	Notes
1872-73	23 Nov 1872	0 - 1dg	Report	XX a side	15 Jan 1873	0 - 1 gl, 2tr	Report	XX a side
1873-74	6 Dec 1873	0 - 0	Report	XX a side	24 Jan 1874	0 - 1 tr ᵜ	Report	XX a side
1874-75	5 Dec 1874	0 - 0	Report	XX a side	20 Feb 1875	0 - 0	Report	XX a side
1875-76	18 Dec 1875	0 - 0	Report	XX a side	29 Jan 1876	0 - 0	Report	XV a side

1st 1872 - 73 match played at Burnbank Park in Woodlands, Glasgow;
2nd 1872 - 73 match played at Raeburn Place in Stockbridge, Edinburgh
1st 1873 - 74 match played at Raeburn Place.
2nd 1873 - 74 match played at Hamilton Crescent in Partick, Glasgow.
1st 1874 - 75 match played at Hamilton Crescent;
2nd 1874 - 75 match played at Raeburn Place.
1st 1875 - 76 match played at Hamilton Crescent;
2nd 1875 - 76 match played at Raeburn Place.

===== Annual matches =====
Season	Date	Score	Report	Notes
1876-77	2 Dec 1876	0 - 1tr	Report	Hamilton Crescent; XV a side
1877-78	1 Dec 1877	0 - 1dg	Report	Hamilton Crescent
1878-79				no match; 9 weeks of frost
1879-80	20 Dec 1879	1gl - 1gl	Report	Hamilton Crescent
1880-81	4 Dec 1880	0 - 1gl, 2 trl	Report	Hamilton Crescent
1881-82	3 Dec 1881	1gl, 1tr - 1tr	Report	Hamilton Crescent
1882-83	2 Dec 1882	1gl, 1 tr - 0	Report	Hamilton Crescent
1883-84	1 Dec 1883	1tr - 1gl, 2tr	Report	Hamilton Crescent
1884-85	6 Dec 1884	1gl - 1tr	Report	Hamilton Crescent
1885-86	5 Dec 1885	1gl, 1tr - 2tr	Report	Hampden Park*
1886-87	4 Dec 1886	1tr - 0	Report	Old Anniesland
1887-88	3 Dec 1887	0 - 2gl, 3tr	Report	Hamilton Crescent
1888-89	1 Dec 1888	1gl - 0	Report	Hamilton Crescent
1889-90	7 Dec 1889	0 - 1dg	Report	Hamilton Crescent
1890-91	6 Dec 1890	1gl, 5tr - 2tr	Report	Hamilton Crescent
1891-92	5 Dec 1891	1dg, 1tr - 1tr	Report	Hamilton Crescent
1892-93	17 Dec 1892	1gl, 1tr - 3tr	Report	Hamilton Crescent
1893-94	16 Dec 1893	2gl, 2tr - 0	Report	Hamilton Crescent
1894-95	1 Dec 1894	2 gl - 2 tr	Report	Hamilton Crescent
1895-96	7 Dec 1895	0 - 0	Report	Hamilton Crescent
1896-97	5 Dec 1896	1tr - 0	Report	Hamilton Crescent
1897-98	4 Dec 1897	1pg, 1tr - 1gl	Report	Hamilton Crescent
1898-99	3 Dec 1898	1dg, 3tr - 0	Report	Hamilton Crescent
1899-1900	2 Dec 1899	1pg - 3tr	Report	Hamilton Crescent
1900-01	1 Dec 1900	0 - 2gl, 3tr	Report	Inverleith
1901-02	7 Dec 1901	0 - 2gl, 2tr	Report	Hamilton Crescent
1902-03	13 Dec 1902	0 - 0	Report	Hamilton Crescent
1903-04	5 Dec 1903	0 - 2gl, 5tr	Report	Hamilton Crescent
1904-05	3 Dec 1904	1tr - 2tr	Report	Hamilton Crescent
1905-06	2 Dec 1905	1gl, 2tr - 1tr	Report	Hamilton Crescent
1906-07	1 Dec 1906	0 - 0	Report	Hamilton Crescent
1907-08	7 Dec 1907	0 - 0	Report	Hamilton Crescent
1908-09	5 Dec 1908	1tr - 1 gl, 1tr	Report	Hamilton Crescent
1909-10	18 Dec 1909	1gl, 2tr - 2gl, 2tr	Report	Hamilton Crescent
1910-11	3 Dec 1910	1gl - 4gl, 2tr	Report	Hamilton Crescent
1911-12	2 Dec 1911	2tr - 3gl, 2tr	Report	Hamilton Crescent
1912-13	7 Dec 1912	1pg, 1tr - 2gl, 1tr	Report	New Anniesland
1913-14	6 Dec 1913	1dg - 1dg	Report	Hamilton Crescent
1914-19				no matches; war years
1919-20	6 Dec 1919	1pg - 2gl, 3tr	Report	Hamilton Crescent
1920-21	4 Dec 1920	1pg, 1tr - 1gl, 2tr	Report	Hamilton Crescent
1921-22	3 Dec 1921	1gl, 1tr - 1pg	Report	New Anniesland
1922-23	2 Dec 1922	1gl, 1tr - 1gl, 4tr	Report	New Anniesland
1923-24	1 Dec 1923	1plg - 1plg	Report	New Anniesland
1924-25	6 Dec 1924	4gl, 3tr - 2tr	Report	New Anniesland
1925-26			Report Report	no match; frost
1926-27	4 Dec 1926	3tr - 3gl, 1p, 1tr	Report	New Anniesland
1927-28	3 Dec 1927	1p - 1gl, 1tr, 1p	Report	Old Anniesland
1928-29	1 Dec 1928	1g, 1d, 2p, 1tr - 3g, 1t	Report	Old Anniesland
1929-30	7 Dec 1929	1gl, 5tr - 1gl, 1tr	Report	Old Anniesland
1930-31	6 Dec 1930	3tr - 2p	Report	Old Anniesland
1931-32	5 Dec 1931	2tr - 1gl, 1p, 1tr	Report	Old Anniesland
1932-33	3 Dec 1932	1gl, 1tr - 1gl, 4tr	Report	Old Anniesland
1933-34	2 Dec 1933	1gl, 1tr - 1p, 4tr	Report	Old Anniesland
1934-35	1 Dec 1934	1tr - 0	Report	Old Anniesland
1935-36	7 Dec 1935	4gl, 3tr - 0	Report	Old Anniesland
1936-37	5 Dec 1936	1gl, 1p, 1tr - 1p	Report	Old Anniesland
1937-38	4 Dec 1937	4gl, 3p - 1p, 1tr	Report	Old Anniesland
1938-39	3 Dec 1938	2p, 1tr - 1dg, 3p, 1tr	Report	Old Anniesland
1939-45				no matches; war years
1945-46	1 Dec 1945	1tr - 5gl,1p, 2tr	Report	Old Anniesland
1946-47	7 Dec 1946	3tr - 4gl, 3tr	Report	Old Anniesland
1947-48	6 Dec 1947	2dg, 1tr - 1gl, 1tr	Report	Old Anniesland
1948-49	4 Dec 1948	2p, 1tr - 1p	Report	Old Anniesland
1949-50	3 Dec 1949	0 - 1gl, 1p	Report	Old Anniesland
1950-51	2 Dec 1950	1gl, 1p, 1tr - 1p	Report	Old Anniesland
1951-52	1 Dec 1951	2tr - 1tr	Report	Old Anniesland
1952-53	13 Dec 1952	1g, 2p, 1t - 2g, 1t	Report	Old Anniesland

* 1885 match played at the 2nd Hampden Park - the modern Hampden Park is the 3rd park with that name. The 2nd Hampden Park was renamed as New Cathkin Park and taken over by Third Lanark.

==== Scottish Inter-District Championship ====
The Inter-City match was then incorporated into the Scottish Inter-District Championship. For Glasgow's professional championship results from 1996 see Glasgow Warriors; for results of later Glasgow - Edinburgh matches see 1872 Cup.

Scottish Inter-District Championship

Season	Pos	Pld	W	D	L	F	A	+/-	BP	Pts	Notes
1953–54	3rd	3	1	0	2	28	20	+8	-	2	
1954–55	2nd	3	1	1	1	40	30	+10	-	3	
1955–56	1st	3	2	1	0	33	22	+11	-	5	
1956–57	4th	3	0	1	2	18	50	-32	-	1	
1957–58	3rd	3	1	0	2	34	29	+5	-	2	
1958–59	4th	3	1	0	2	14	30	-16	-	2	
1959–60	4th	3	0	0	3	14	55	-41	-	0	
1960–61	4th	3	0	0	3	14	53	-39	-	0	
1961–62	4th	3	0	0	3	9	52	-43	-	0	
1962–63	3rd	3	1	0	2	18	20	-2	-	2	
1963–64	3rd	3	1	0	2	11	24	-13	-	2	
1964–65	1st=	3	2	0	1	25	18	+7	-	4	Shared with South
1965–66	4th	3	0	0	3	14	46	-32	-	0	
1966–67	3rd	3	1	0	2	29	49	-20	-	2	
1967–68	1st=	3	2	0	1	31	29	+2	-	4	Shared with Edinburgh and South
1968–69	3rd	3	1	0	2	48	46	+2	-	2	
1969–70	2nd	3	2	0	1	35	22	+13	-	4	
1970–71	2nd	2	1	0	1	29	28	+1	-	2	North and Midlands match cancelled
1971–72	1st=	3	2	0	1	52	43	+9	-	4	Edinburgh won play-off
1972–73	1st=	3	2	0	1	70	74	-4	-	4	
1973–74	1st	3	3	0	0	44	38	+6	-	6	
1974–75	1st=	3	2	0	1	29	28	+1	-	4	Shared with North and Midlands
1975–76	1st=	3	2	0	1	38	34	+4	-	4	Shared with South and Edinburgh
1976–77	4th	3	0	0	3	26	93	-67	-	0	
1977–78	1st=	3	2	0	1	56	15	+31	-	4	Shared with South & Edinburgh
1978–79	3rd	3	1	0	2	28	68	-40	-	2	
1979–80	3rd	3	1	0	2	41	31	+10	-	2	
1980–81	2nd	3	2	0	1	48	54	-6	-	4	
1981–82	4th	4	1	0	3	36	81	-45	-	2	
1982–83	4th	4	1	0	3	57	58	-1	-	2	
1983–84	4th	4	2	0	2	57	71	-14	-	4	
1984–85	5th	4	0	0	4	28	68	-40	-	0	
1985–86	4th	4	1	0	3	66	56	+10	-	2	
1986–87	4th	4	1	0	3	68	99	-31	-	2	
1987–88	4th	4	1	0	3	53	104	-51	-	2	
1988–89	4th	4	1	0	3	56	117	-61	-	2	
1989–90	1st	4	3	1	0	78	54	+24	-	7	
1990–91	2nd	4	2	1	1	54	59	-5	-	5	
1991–92	4th	2	1	0	1	20	34	-14	-	2	Abbreviated tournament - no winner
1992–93	4th	4	1	1	2	44	59	-15	-	3	
1993–94	2nd	2	1	0	1	35	34	+1	-	-	(lost to South in cup final)
1994–95	5th	4	1	0	3	62	95	-33	-	2	
1995–96	5th	4	0	0	4	63	161	-98	-	0	

===== Professional Era =====
The Amateur Scottish Inter-District Championship has been restarted twice in the professional era. The first restart was from 1999 to 2002; the second restart from the 2022-23 season.

Season	Pos	Pld	W	D	L	F	A	+/-	BP	Pts	Notes
1999–2000	4th	3	0	0	3	72	107	-35	4	4	
2000–01	4th	4	2	0	2	50	100	-50	-	8	
2001–02	2nd	4	3	0	1	100	70	+30	1	14	
2022–23	3rd	2	1	0	1	49	70	-21	-	4	

== Partial list of games played against international opposition ==
Year	Date	Opponent	Venue	Result	Score	Tour
1902	20 December	Canada	Hamilton Crescent, Glasgow	Win	11–3	1902-03 Canada rugby union tour
1931	28 October	South Africa	Hughenden Stadium, Glasgow	Loss	13–21	1931–32 South Africa rugby union tour
1974	24 September	Tonga	Hughenden Stadium, Glasgow	Win	33–16	Report
1979	6 November	New Zealand	Hughenden Stadium, Glasgow	Loss	6–12	1979 New Zealand tour of England, Scotland & Italy
1981	12 December	Australia	Murrayfield Stadium, Edinburgh	Loss	0–31	1981–82 Australia rugby union tour of Britain and Ireland Preview Report
1984	4 December	Australia	Hughenden Stadium, Glasgow	Loss	12–26	1984 Australia tour of Britain & Ireland; Report Report
1985	6 September	Netherlands	The Hague	Win	26–12	Preview Report
1985	8 September	Belgium	Brussels	Win	23–9	Preview Report Tour Report
1987	16 September	France	Hughenden Stadium	Loss	9–28	Preview Report
1989	27 October	Fiji	Hughenden Stadium, Glasgow	Win	22–11	1989 Fiji rugby union tour of Europe

== Notable former players ==
=== British and Irish Lions from Glasgow District ===
The following former Glasgow District players have represented the British and Irish Lions.

- (Scotland) Angus Cameron
- (Scotland) Ian McLauchlan
- (Scotland) Bill Scott
- (Scotland) Robert Wilson Shaw
- (Scotland) Herbert Waddell
- (Scotland) Robert MacMillan
- (Scotland) John Beattie
- (Scotland) Laurie Duff
- (Scotland) Sandy Carmichael

=== Notable non-Scottish players ===
The following is a list of notable non-Scottish international representative former Glasgow players:

New Zealand

- (New Zealand) Noel Bowden

Wales

- (Wales) Charles Nicholl

== See also ==
- Glasgow Warriors
