= 1976–77 Scottish Inter-District Championship =

Rugby union competition

- Countries: Scotland
- Date: 1976–77
- Champions: South
- Matches played: 6

The 1976–77 Scottish Inter-District Championship was a rugby union competition for Scotland's district teams.

This season saw the 24th Scottish Inter-District Championship.

South won the competition with 3 wins.

== 1976-77 League Table ==
Team	P	W	D	L	PF	PA	+/-	Pts
South	3	3	0	0	84	28	+56	6
Edinburgh District	3	2	0	1	85	51	+34	4
North and Midlands	3	1	0	2	54	86	-32	2
Glasgow District	3	0	0	3	26	93	-67	0

== Results ==
Date	Try	Conversion	Penalty	Dropped goal	Goal from mark	Notes
1971–1977	4 points	2 points	3 points	3 points	3 points	

=== Round 1 ===
26 October 1976

South	43 – 0	Glasgow District
	Preview; Report

Poynder Park, Kelso
Referee: W. A. Bryce (Edinburgh Northern)

South:
Glasgow District:

=== Round 2 ===
30 October 1976

North and Midlands	–	Edinburgh District
	Preview; Preview [ Report]

Mayfield Park, Dundee

North and Midlands:
Edinburgh District:
