= 1978–79 Scottish Inter-District Championship =

Rugby union competition

- Countries: Scotland
- Date: 1978–79
- Champions: South
- Runners-up: Edinburgh District
- Matches played: 6

The 1978–79 Scottish Inter-District Championship was a rugby union competition for Scotland's district teams.

This season saw the 26th Scottish Inter-District Championship.

South won the competition with 3 wins.

== 1978-79 League Table ==
Team	P	W	D	L	PF	PA	+/-	Pts
South	3	3	0	0	60	22	+38	6
Edinburgh District	3	2	0	1	85	42	+43	4
Glasgow District	3	1	0	2	28	68	-40	2
North and Midlands	3	0	0	3	23	64	-41	0

== Results ==
Date	Try	Conversion	Penalty	Dropped goal	Goal from mark	Notes
1977–1991	4 points	2 points	3 points	3 points	—	

=== Round 1 ===
16 December 1978

North and Midlands	4 – 22	South
	Preview; Report

Duffus Park, Cupar
Referee: J. W. Dinsmore (West of Scotland)

North and Midlands:
South:

16 December 1978

Edinburgh District	44 – 9	Glasgow District
	Preview; Report

Inverleith, Edinburgh
Referee: J. A. Short (Hawick)

Edinburgh District:
Glasgow District:

=== Round 2 ===
23 December 1978

Glasgow District	13 – 6	North and Midlands
	Preview; Report; Report

Murrayfield Stadium
Referee: C. Robertson (Hawick)

Glasgow District:
North and Midlands:

23 December 1978

South	20 – 12	Edinburgh District
	Preview; Report; Report

Murrayfield Stadium
Referee: E. Anderson (Ardrossan Academicals)

South:
Edinburgh District:

=== Round 3 ===
27 January 1979

South	18 – 6	Glasgow District
	Preview; Preview; Preview; Preview; Preview; Preview; Report

Murrayfield Stadium
Referee: E. N. Sheret (Howe of Fife)

South:
Glasgow District:

27 January 1979

North and Midlands	13 – 29	Edinburgh District
	Preview; Preview; Preview; Report

Murrayfield Stadium
Referee: G. G. Murray (Kelso)

North and Midlands:
Edinburgh District:

== Matches outwith the Championship ==
=== Trial matches ===
30 December 1978

Scotland Probables	-	Scotland Possibles
	Preview

Murrayfield Stadium

Probables:
Possibles:
