= Scottish Inter-District Championship =

Scottish rugby union competition

- Organiser(s): SRU
- Founded: 1953; 73 years ago
- Region: Scotland
- Teams: 3–5
- Current champions: South of Scotland (2023-24)
- Most championships: South (18 titles)

The Scottish Inter-District Championship is a rugby union competition between regional sides in Scotland. Established in 1953, the tournament went through several formats.

The Scottish Rugby Union confirmed in January 2023 that the Scottish Inter-District Championship would return for the 2022-23 season, starting in May 2023. The Inter-District Championship will be an amateur championship with players selected outwith the professional United Rugby Championship and Super 6 leagues. Instead the players will be selected from the amateur leagues of Scotland; the Scottish Premiership and the national leagues below.

== History ==
Scotland had four District Sides: Edinburgh, Glasgow, North and Midlands and the South. Edinburgh and Glasgow were formed in 1872 and played the world's first ever inter-district match in that year. The district sides capped the best amateur players from their area's club sides to play inter-district matches and matches against touring sides.

== Formation ==
The Inter-district championship was established in the 1953–54 season. The first season saw Edinburgh, Glasgow, North and South challenge for the championship. The North of Scotland side in that first season contained many Midlands players so the Midlands District complained to the Scottish Rugby Union that they should have acknowledgement for their contribution to the North squad. The SRU agreed to this and from 1954 to 1955 season onwards the combined North of Scotland and Midlands side was known as North and Midlands.

The Edinburgh, Glasgow, North and Midlands, and South sides would play-off to see which district was best in Scotland. In later years a Scottish Exiles team was also invited into this championship.

== Tournament format ==
Whether with four or five sides each team would play one another only once; either at home or away. Usually contested with only the four home-based Scottish districts, this meant that each team only played three matches. This created a situation where the tournament winners were often shared with two or three teams. It was thus a difficult tournament to win outright.

Occasionally though a deciding system was used. In 1972–73 Edinburgh and Glasgow tied for the Championship and a separate play-off was agreed; which Edinburgh won. A knock-out system was used in 1993–94. In 1997–98, the last year before the four professional sides merged into two sides, it was agreed beforehand that, should the league places be tied, the number of tries would decide the winner. The season ended with a three-way tie between Edinburgh Rugby, Glasgow Warriors and Caledonia Reds, with Edinburgh coming out on top with tries scored.

In the last Professional Inter-District Championship, the Bank of Scotland Pro Cup between Border Reivers, Edinburgh Rugby and Glasgow Warriors in 2002–03, the format was extended. Each team played their opponents twice at home and twice away. In addition, the bonus point system was used for tries and loses. The top two teams qualified for the next season's Heineken Cup and the other team was entered into the Challenge Cup.

== Professionalism ==
With professionalism, the four District Sides, Edinburgh, Glasgow, North and Midlands, and the South, were to become Edinburgh Rugby, Glasgow Warriors, Caledonia Reds and the Border Reivers.

With the advent of the professional game in Scotland, the Scottish Inter-District Championship now became a European Qualifying Tournament for the professional Scottish districts to determine if they qualified for the European Champions Cup (then the Heineken Cup) or the European Challenge Cup (then the European Conference or Amlin Cup). This meant that the Scottish Exiles no longer competed in the tournament.

== Merger of professional teams ==
In 1998, on the mergers of Edinburgh Rugby with the Border Reivers to form the Edinburgh Reivers, and Glasgow Rugby and Caledonia Reds to form Glasgow Caledonians, the death knell was sounded for the Championship.

After the Tennents Tri-Series between Edinburgh and Glasgow in 1998–99, the Tri-Series survived into 1999–2000 without a sponsor. The Inter-District Championship then lingered on at amateur level once more till 2002 with the best players at amateur level once again playing for Edinburgh District, Glasgow District, Caledonia and Borders.

The professional Inter-District Championship was briefly resurrected in a new form in the 2002–03 season – with the re-establishment of the Border Reivers side – as the Bank of Scotland Pro Cup. However the Championship's return at professional level only lasted a single season as the expansion of the Celtic League the following season meant that the SRU scrapped the tournament to avoid fixture congestion with the Celtic League and European tournaments.

The Border Reivers subsequent demise in 2007 saw once again Edinburgh and Glasgow as the only remaining Scottish professional sides making any prospect of a return of the Championship – as a Tri-Series again – remote, particularly in the light of fixture congestion.

Instead the two remaining sides, Edinburgh Rugby and Glasgow Warriors, use their Pro14 league matches to determine the winner of the 1872 Cup, a memorial to the world's first inter-district match.

== Amateur championship return ==
The amateur championship has returned twice in the professional era. It first returned from 1999 to 2002. The SRU announced it would return again for the season 2022-23; with the selection of amateur players to help guide selection for the Scotland Club XV international team.

== Age Grades ==
The Inter-District Championship is still contested at age grades.

== Inter-District Championship Winners ==
=== Amateur Era ===
The 1953–54 season saw play-offs between Edinburgh District, Glasgow District, North of Scotland, and South of Scotland. Despite its name, the North of Scotland district played many players from the Midlands district in its side. The combined team formally competed as North and Midlands from season 1954–55.

The Scottish Exiles, then as the Anglo-Scots, joined the Inter-District Championship from 1981 onwards.

South of Scotland	Glasgow and the West	Caledonia Reds	The Edinburgh District	Scottish Exiles (Defunct)	Shared	Incomplete

Ed.	Season	Winners	Record	Notes
1	1953–54	Edinburgh District	Won 3	
2	1954–55	South of Scotland	Won 3	
3	1955–56	Glasgow District	Won 2; Drawn 1	
4	1956–57	Edinburgh District / South of Scotland	Won 2; Lost 1	
5	1957–58	Edinburgh District / South of Scotland	Won 2; Drawn 1	
6	1958–59	Edinburgh District / South of Scotland	Won 2; Lost 1	
7	1959–60	Edinburgh District / South of Scotland / North and Midlands	Won 2; Lost 1	
8	1960–61	Edinburgh District	Won 3	
9	1961–62	Edinburgh District / South of Scotland	Won 2; Drawn 1	
10	1962–63	Edinburgh District	Won 3	
11	1963–64	South of Scotland	Won 3	
12	1964–65	South of Scotland / Glasgow District	Won 2; Lost 1	
13	1965–66	South of Scotland	Won 3	
14	1966–67	South of Scotland	Won 2; Drawn 1	
15	1967–68	Edinburgh District / South of Scotland / Glasgow District	Won 2; Lost 1	
16	1968–69	South of Scotland	Won 3	
17	1969–70	South of Scotland	Won 2; Drawn 1	
18	1970–71	South of Scotland	Won 3	
19	1971–72	Edinburgh District	Won 2; Lost 1	Glasgow District lost play-off
20	1972–73	Edinburgh District / Glasgow District	Won 2; Lost 1	
21	1973–74	Glasgow District	Won 3	
22	1974–75	North and Midlands / Glasgow District	Won 2; Lost 1	
23	1975–76	South of Scotland / Glasgow District / Edinburgh District	Won 2; Lost 1	
24	1976–77	South of Scotland	Won 3	
25	1977–78	Glasgow District / South of Scotland / Edinburgh District	Won 2; Lost 1	
26	1978–79	South of Scotland	Won 3	
27	1979–80	Edinburgh District	Won 3	
28	1980–81	South of Scotland	Won 3	
29	1981–82	Edinburgh District / South of Scotland	Won 3; Drawn 1	
30	1982–83	South of Scotland	Won 4	
31	1983–84	South of Scotland	Won 4	
32	1984–85	South of Scotland	Won 4	
33	1985–86	South of Scotland	Won 4	
34	1986–87	Edinburgh District	Won 4	
35	1987–88	Edinburgh District	Won 4	
36	1988–89	Edinburgh District	Won 4	
37	1989–90	Glasgow District	Won 3; Drawn 1	
38	1990–91	South of Scotland	Won 3; Drawn 1	
39	1991–92	No winner		Abbreviated tournament
40	1992–93	South of Scotland	Won 3; Lost 1	
41	1993–94	South of Scotland	Won 2	Knock-out competition
42	1994–95	Scottish Exiles	Won 4	
43	1995–96	Scottish Exiles	Won 4	

=== Professional Era ===
In its professional guise, the Scottish Exiles were omitted from the Championship.

Border Reivers	Glasgow Warriors	Caledonia Reds	Edinburgh	Scottish Exiles	Shared	No Professional Inter-District

Ed.	Season	Winners	Record	Notes
44	1996–97	Caledonia Reds	Won 2; Drawn 1	
45	1997–98	Edinburgh	Won 2; Lost 1	Edinburgh beat Glasgow on tries scored
46	1998–99	Edinburgh	Won 2; Lost 1	Tri-Series: 3 Edinburgh – Glasgow games
47	1999–2000	Glasgow Warriors	Won 2; Lost 1	Tri-Series: 3 Edinburgh – Glasgow games
–	2000–01	No winner		No Pro tournament held
–	2001–02	No winner		No Pro tournament held
48	2002–03	Edinburgh	Won 5; Lost 2	

==== Amateur Championship restarted ====
The Amateur Inter-District has been restarted twice in the professional era. The first restart was from 1999 to 2002; the second restart from the 2022-23 season.

South of Scotland	Glasgow District	Caledonia Reds	Edinburgh District	Scottish Exiles	Shared	Incomplete

The amateur Inter-District Championship was briefly played again between 1999 and 2002. The North and Midlands were renamed as Caledonia; the South were renamed Scottish Borders. The Scottish Exiles did not enter in the first 1999–2000 season but entered as an amateur district in the two subsequent seasons.

Season	Winners	Record	Notes
1999–2000	Caledonia Reds	Won 3	
2000–01	Scottish Exiles	Won 4	
2001–02	Scottish Borders	Won 4	

The Scottish Rugby Union announced in January 2023, that the Scottish Inter-District Championship for season 2022-23 would take place in May 2023. The teams would be the traditional districts Glasgow District including the West of Scotland; Edinburgh District encompassing the Lothians; the Caledonia region encompassing the old North of Scotland and Midlands districts; and the South of Scotland district.

Season	Winners	Record	Notes
2022–23	Caledonia Reds	Won 2	Final
2023–24	South of Scotland	Won 3	
2025–26	Glasgow & The West	Won 2	
