= Edinburgh District (rugby union) =

Scottish district rugby union team

- Founded: 1872; 154 years ago
- Location: Edinburgh, Scotland
- Coach: Bob McKillop
- Captain: Rhys Davies
- League: Scottish Inter-District Championship
- 2022-23: 4th
Team kit
- Current season

Edinburgh District is a Scottish amateur rugby union team which plays in the amateur Scottish Inter-District Championship. It draws its players mainly from the Edinburgh area, as well as others from the rest of east central Scotland; roughly corresponding to the old Lothian regional council area. Historically the Edinburgh District team played matches against touring teams visiting Scotland from abroad, and also competed in the Scottish Inter-District Championship.

The Edinburgh District rugby union team was founded in 1872. The team played the world's first inter-district match that year against the Glasgow District rugby union team.

The amateur Edinburgh District side evolved into the professional Edinburgh Rugby side in 1996; one year after rugby union allowed professionalism in 1995. However the amateur district is still used for the representation of amateur players in the Inter-District Championship; and this amateur championship guides the selection of Scotland Club XV international players.

In 2022 the Inter-District Championship was reintroduced. The Edinburgh District competed in the tournament, playing in fixtures against the South of Scotland, and Glasgow and the West.

== Formation ==
The Edinburgh District side was formed in 1872 to play against a Glasgow District side.

The teams met on 23 November 1872 at Burnbank Park and Edinburgh won 1 drop goal – 0 in a 20-a-side fixture. This is the oldest inter-district match in the world and to mark this the current Glasgow Warriors and Edinburgh Rugby sides play for the 1872 Cup every year.

The first Edinburgh team in 1872:

Backs: A. Ross (Wanderers), J. Patullo (Craigmount), Thomas Roger Marshall (Edinburgh Academicals), W. St. Clair Grant (Craigmount), J. Junor (Royal High School), James Andrew Whitelock Mein (Edinburgh Academicals), and E. Thew (Merchistonians)
Forwards: Francis Moncreiff (captain), R. W. Irvine, E. M. Bannerman, James Finlay (Edinburgh Academicals), Angus Buchanan, Alexander Petrie, and M. Sanderson (Royal High School), Charles Cathcart and John Lisle Hall MacFarlane (Edinburgh University), Tom Whittington (Merchistonians), Benjamin Blyth II (Merchistonians), J. Forsyth and A. R. Stewart (Wanderers)

== Selection of representative players ==
Often to aid the selection process of Edinburgh District's players a trial match was played.

In Edinburgh's case a trial match of hopefuls was divided into Stripes and Plain teams, so the players could impress the selectors.

== Early history ==
The Glasgow v Edinburgh district fixture was more or less played annually. The first 15 a side match was played in 1876. Edinburgh won the first fixtures and it wasn't until 1881 that Glasgow won the thirteenth attempt. Glasgow then held dominance until 1887 when once more Edinburgh won again. From the 1880s to the close of the 1890s Edinburgh won a total of only four times in 20-years. The tide turned back in Edinburgh's favour in 1898. With only a solitary Glasgow win in 1905, Edinburgh held sway until 1914.

The games were postponed during the First World War period. After 50-years at Burnbank - the West of Scotland ground in Woodlands, Glasgow – the Glasgow v Edinburgh fixture moved to Glasgow Academical's ground at Anniesland, Glasgow, in 1922. This move prompted yet another shift in balance as Glasgow once again became the dominant force of the two districts.

== Scottish Inter-District Championship ==
Two other Scottish districts South and North and Midlands had also been formed and there was regular matches between the four Scottish districts as well as against the touring sides.

The Scottish Inter-District Championship was established in the 1953–54 season. The Glasgow District, Edinburgh, South and North and Midlands sides would play off to see which district was best in Scotland. Occasionally London Scottish or an Anglo-Scots team was also invited into this championship.

- Edinburgh v North and Midlands 20 November 1965 match report
- Edinburgh v Glasgow 4 December 1965 match report
- Edinburgh v North and Midlands 4 November 1967 match report
- Edinburgh v Glasgow 22 December 1973 match reportReport2
- Edinburgh v North and Midlands 29 December 1973 match report
- Edinburgh v Glasgow 7 December 1974 match report

== Effect of professionalism ==
With the advent of professionalism in 1995, the Scottish Rugby Union realised that not even the best semi-professional Scottish club teams could compete in the new Professional Era in rugby union, which was beginning to gain great momentum in the professional leagues of the Southern Hemisphere and the Northern Hemisphere.

In an attempt to stay in touch with the leading nations the SRU formed four professional teams out of the four amateur districts of Scotland in 1996. It was these newly professional teams that would represent Scotland in the Heineken Cup and in the Celtic League. The amateur Edinburgh District side was to become the professional Edinburgh Rugby side.

For the subsequent history of the professional Edinburgh rugby district team from 1996, see Edinburgh rugby.

== Rebirth of the amateur district ==
Edinburgh District as an amateur district, will return in the 2022–23 Amateur Scottish Inter-District Championship. Its Head Coach will be Bob McKillop, previously a Scotland age-grade coach, aided by assistant coaches Alex Hagart (Stewart’s Melville), Mark Cairns (Currie Chieftains) and Iain Bethinussen (Edinburgh Academical).

McKillop noted:

Having grown up in an era when the Inter-district Championship was something special for players and coaches to be involved in, it is fantastic to see it being revived. It’s a huge privilege to be asked to work with the best coaches and players in the Edinburgh District. We want to create an environment the players fall in love with and go back and tell their club mates how great the experience was. I’m especially looking forward to our game at Netherdale because I know the Borders fans will buy into this and make it a great occasion. I really hope this is the start of the re-emergence of the competition, and that it goes from strength to strength over the next few seasons.

== Honours ==
=== Season standings ===
==== Inter-City ====
Inter-City	No Inter-City played

Glasgow score given first. ᵜ Previous to 1876 only goals counted; tries were ignored in the result.

Scoreline key:

Glasgow win	Edinburgh win	Draw

===== Twice a season matches =====
Season	Date	Score	Report	Notes	Date	Score	Report	Notes
1872-73	23 Nov 1872	0 - 1dg	Report	XX a side	15 Jan 1873	0 - 1 gl, 2tr	Detail	XX a side
1873-74	6 Dec 1873	0 - 0	Report	XX a side	24 Jan 1874	0 - 1 tr ᵜ	Report	XX a side
1874-75	5 Dec 1874	0 - 0	Report	XX a side	20 Feb 1875	0 - 0	Report	XX a side
1875-76	18 Dec 1875	0 - 0	Report	XX a side	29 Jan 1876	0 - 0	Report	XV a side

===== Annual matches =====
Season	Date	Score	Report	Notes
1876-77	2 Dec 1876	0 - 1tr	Report	XV a side from now on
1877-78	1 Dec 1877	0 - 1dg	Report	
1878-79				no match; 9 weeks of frost
1879-80	20 Dec 1879	1gl - 1gl	Report	
1880-81	4 Dec 1880	0 - 1gl, 2 trl	Report	
1881-82	3 Dec 1881	1gl, 1tr - 1tr	Report	
1882-83	2 Dec 1882	1gl, 1 tr - 0	Report	
1883-84	1 Dec 1883	1tr - 1gl, 2tr	Report	
1884-85	6 Dec 1884	1gl - 1tr	Report	
1885-86	5 Dec 1885	1gl, 1tr - 2tr	Report	Hampden Park
1886-87	4 Dec 1886	1tr - 0	Report	
1887-88	3 Dec 1887	0 - 2gl, 3tr	Report	
1888-89	1 Dec 1888	1gl - 0	Report	
1889-90	7 Dec 1889	0 - 1dg	Report	
1890-91	6 Dec 1890	1gl, 5tr - 2tr	Report	
1891-92	5 Dec 1891	1dg, 1tr - 1tr	Report	
1892-93	17 Dec 1892	1gl, 1tr - 3tr	Report	
1893-94	16 Dec 1893	2gl, 2tr - 0	Report	
1894-95	1 Dec 1894	2 gl - 2 tr	Report	
1895-96	7 Dec 1895	0 - 0	Report	
1896-97	5 Dec 1896	1tr - 0	Report	
1897-98	4 Dec 1897	1pg, 1tr - 1gl	Report	
1898-99	3 Dec 1898	1dg, 3tr - 0	Report	
1899-1900	2 Dec 1899	1pg - 3tr	Report	
1900-01	1 Dec 1900	0 - 2gl, 3tr	Report	
1901-02	7 Dec 1901	0 - 2gl, 2tr	Report	
1902-03	13 Dec 1902	0 - 0	Report	
1903-04	5 Dec 1903	0 - 2gl, 5tr	Report	
1904-05	3 Dec 1904	1tr - 2tr	Report	
1905-06	2 Dec 1905	1gl, 2tr - 1tr	Report	
1906-07	1 Dec 1906	0 - 0	Report	
1907-08	7 Dec 1907	0 - 0	Report	
1908-09	5 Dec 1908	1gl, 1tr - 1tr	Report	
1909-10	18 Dec 1909	1gl, 2tr - 2gl, 2tr	Report	
1910-11	3 Dec 1910	1gl - 4gl, 2tr	Report	
1911-12	2 Dec 1911	2tr - 3gl, 2tr	Report	
1912-13	7 Dec 1912	1pg, 1tr - 2gl, 1tr	Report	
1913-14	6 Dec 1913	1dg - 1dg	Report	
1914-19				no matches; war years
1919-20	6 Dec 1919	1pg - 2gl, 3tr	Report	
1920-21	4 Dec 1920	1pg, 1tr - 1gl, 2tr	Report	
1921-22	3 Dec 1921	1gl, 1tr - 1pg	Report	
1922-23	2 Dec 1922	1gl, 1tr - 1gl, 4tr	Report	Old Anniesland
1923-24	1 Dec 1923	1plg - 1plg	Report	
1924-25	6 Dec 1924	4gl, 3tr - 2tr	Report	
1925-26			Report Report	no match; frost
1926-27	4 Dec 1926	3tr - 3gl, 1p, 1tr	Report	
1927-28	3 Dec 1927	1p - 1gl, 1tr, 1p	Report	
1928-29	1 Dec 1928	1g, 1d, 2p, 1tr - 3g, 1t	Report	
1929-30	7 Dec 1929	1gl, 5tr - 1gl, 1tr	Report	
1930-31	6 Dec 1930	3tr - 2p	Report	
1931-32	5 Dec 1931	2tr - 1gl, 1p, 1tr	Report	
1932-33	3 Dec 1932	1gl, 1tr - 1gl, 4tr	Report	
1933-34	2 Dec 1933	1gl, 1tr - 1p, 4tr	Report	
1934-35	1 Dec 1934	1tr - 0	Report	
1935-36	7 Dec 1935	4gl, 3tr - 0	Report	
1936-37	5 Dec 1936	1gl, 1p, 1tr - 1p	Report	
1937-38	4 Dec 1937	4gl, 3p - 1p, 1tr	Report	
1938-39	3 Dec 1938	2p, 1tr - 1dg, 3p, 1tr	Report	
1939-45				no matches; war years
1945-46	1 Dec 1945	1tr - 5gl,1p, 2tr	Report	
1946-47	7 Dec 1946	3tr - 4gl, 3tr	Report	
1947-48	6 Dec 1947	2dg, 1tr - 1gl, 1tr	Report	
1948-49	4 Dec 1948	2p, 1tr - 1p	Report	
1949-50	3 Dec 1949	0 - 1gl, 1p	Report	
1950-51	2 Dec 1950	1gl, 1p, 1tr - 1p	Report	
1951-52	1 Dec 1951	2tr - 1tr	Report	
1952-53	13 Dec 1952	1g, 2p, 1t - 2g, 1t	Report	

==== Scottish Inter-District Championship ====
The Inter-City match was then incorporated into the Scottish Inter-District Championship. For Glasgow's professional championship results from 1996 see Glasgow Warriors; for results of later Glasgow - Edinburgh matches see 1872 Cup.

Scottish Inter-District Championship

Season	Pos	Pld	W	D	L	F	A	+/-	BP	Pts	Notes
1953–54	1st	3	3	0	0	53	18	+35	-	6	
1954–55	3rd	3	1	1	1	23	17	+6	-	3	
1955–56	2nd	3	1	2	0	30	9	+21	-	4	
1956–57	1st=	3	2	0	1	36	28	+8	-	4	Shared with South
1957–58	1st=	3	2	1	0	42	23	+19	-	5	Shared with South
1958–59	1st=	3	2	0	1	20	24	-4	-	4	Shared with South
1959–60	1st=	3	2	0	1	31	35	-4	-	4	Shared with South & North and Midlands
1960–61	1st	3	3	0	0	43	14	+29	-	6	
1961–62	1st=	3	2	1	0	37	9	+28	-	5	Shared with South
1962–63	1st	3	3	0	0	38	9	+29	-	6	
1963–64	2nd	3	2	0	1	30	15	+15	-	4	
1964–65	4th	3	1	0	2	25	33	-8	-	2	
1965–66	2nd	3	2	0	1	32	11	+21	-	4	
1966–67	4th	3	0	1	2	19	28	-9	-	1	
1967–68	1st=	3	2	0	1	48	25	+23	-	4	Shared with South & Glasgow
1968–69	2nd	3	1	1	1	42	54	-12	-	3	
1969–70	4th	3	0	1	2	12	28	-16	-	1	
1970–71	3rd	3	1	0	2	44	49	-5	-	2	
1971–72	1st= (CH)	3	2	0	1	42	36	+6	-	4	Edinburgh beat Glasgow in play-off
1972–73	1st=	3	2	0	1	54	41	+13	-	4	
1973–74	4th	3	0	0	3	19	38	-19	-	0	
1974–75	3rd	3	1	0	2	27	32	-5	-	2	
1975–76	1st=	3	2	0	1	38	34	+4	-	4	
1976–77	2nd	3	2	0	1	85	51	+34	-	4	
1977–78	1st=	3	2	0	1	49	34	+15	-	4	Shared with Glasgow & South
1978–79	2nd	3	2	0	1	85	42	+43	-	4	
1979–80	1st	3	3	0	0	103	31	+72	-	6	
1980–81	3rd	3	1	0	2	74	33	+41	-	2	
1981–82	1st=	4	3	1	0	80	28	+52	-	7	Shared with South
1982–83	3rd	4	2	0	2	88	66	+22	-	4	
1983–84	2nd	4	2	0	2	107	59	+48	-	4	
1984–85	2nd	4	3	0	1	82	59	+23	-	6	
1985–86	2nd	4	3	0	1	65	38	+27	-	6	
1986–87	1st	4	4	0	0	96	51	+45	-	8	
1987–88	1st	4	4	0	0	88	55	+33	-	8	
1988–89	1st	4	4	0	0	115	45	+70	-	8	
1989–90	3rd	4	2	1	1	93	65	+28	-	5	
1990–91	3rd	4	1	2	1	63	70	-7	-	4	
1991–92	5th	2	1	0	1	21	44	-23	-	2	Abbreviated tournament - no winner
1992–93	2nd	4	2	1	1	93	69	+24	-	5	
1993–94	3rd	2	1	0	1	34	46	-12	-	-	
1994–95	2nd	4	1	2	1	62	62	0	-	4	
1995–96	2nd	4	2	0	2	109	82	+27	-	4	

===== Professional Era =====
The Amateur Scottish Inter-District Championship has been restarted twice in the professional era. The first restart was from 1999 to 2002; the second restart from the 2022-23 season.

Season	Pos	Pld	W	D	L	F	A	+/-	BP	Pts	Notes
1999–2000	3rd	3	1	0	2	90	118	-28	2	6	
2000–01	3rd	4	2	0	2	94	86	+8	2	11	
2001–02	5th	4	0	0	4	66	176	-110	1	1	
2022–23	4th	2	0	0	2	29	72	-43	0	0	

== Partial list of games played against international opposition ==
24 November 1962: Edinburgh 22–3 Canada, at Murrayfield
19 November 1975: Edinburgh 10–19 Australia, at Myreside
31 October 1979: Edinburgh 4–16 New Zealand, at Myreside
19 September 1981: Edinburgh 13–18 Romania, at Myreside
15 September 1982: Edinburgh 47–12 Fiji, at Myreside
26 October 1983: Edinburgh 6–22 New Zealand, at Myreside
23 September 1986: Edinburgh 26–14 Japan, at Myreside
23 September 1987: Edinburgh 9–22 France, at Goldenacre
9 November 1988: Edinburgh 19–25 Australia, at Myreside
8 November 1995: Edinburgh 22–35 Western Samoa, at Inverleith
24 August 2007: Edinburgh 14-26 Tonga, at Myreside

== Notable players ==
- James Robertson - world's first black rugby union player.
- Eric Liddell - won the 1924 Olympic gold medal for the 400 metres in athletics.

== See also ==
- Edinburgh Rugby
