= South of Scotland District (rugby union) =

Scottish district rugby union team

South of Scotland
- Full name: South of Scotland District
- Founded: 1881; 145 years ago
- Coach(es): Head Coach - Matty Douglas Assistant Coach - Bert Grigg; Assistant Coach - Andrew Clark Assistant Coach - Iain Chisholm
- Captain: Shawn Muir
- League: Scottish Inter-District Championship
- 2022-23: 2nd
Team kit
- Current season

The South of Scotland District is a Scottish amateur rugby union team which plays in the amateur Scottish Inter-District Championship. It draws its players from the South of Scotland, mainly the Scottish Borders where there has always been a proud tradition of rugby union. Historically the South team played matches against touring teams visiting Scotland from abroad, and also competed in the Scottish Inter-District Championship. After rugby union became a professional sport in 1995, the team was replaced in 1996 by the new Border Reivers team based in the same geographical area as the South and who wore the same colours as the old team.

When the professional Border Reivers provincial side folded in 1998, the South amateur district was resurrected and renamed Scottish Borders. The team played as Scottish Borders in three seasons of an amateur Scottish Inter-District Championship from 1999 to 2002. However, when the amateur district championship was again revived in the 2022-23 season, the team reverted to its old South of Scotland name.

The professional side Border Reivers was resurrected in 2002 to play in the new Celtic League. It folded again in 2007.

The amateur district is still used for the representation of amateur players in the Inter-District Championship; and this amateur championship guides the selection of Scotland Club XV international players.

The South region also plays at age-grade as the Borders side. The region now includes the Scottish Borders and East Lothian. It contributes professional players to the provincial Edinburgh Rugby side.

== Early years ==
The SRU wanted North and South districts to complement its West and East district sides. Happily for them, the Borders were producing fine sides - and rugby union was spreading northwards into Aberdeenshire. It was the provincial clubs though that ultimately forced the Union's hand; led by the arguments of the Aberdeenshire club. Nat Brewis , as honorary secretary of the SRU approved the North-South match in 1880 and sides were named, but owing to the weather the fixture was not played. It was though played the following season.

The first North v South match came off on 31 December 1881; the North winning by 1 goal and 1 try to 2 tries. Along with players from Melrose, Hawick, Roxburgh County, Hawick St. Cuthberts and Galashiels, were players from Paisley and Greenock Wanderers for the South.

The North v South match came off again on 30 December 1882; the North winning by 1 try to nil.

The South played Edinburgh District in December 1890 drawing 2 tries a piece.

- South v North 11 December 1909 match report

The South prop Jock Allan was the first married man to play for Scotland in 1934.

=== Rugby union in the Borders Regions ===
Borders Rugby has many traditions. The Border League was the first rugby union league to be set up anywhere in the world, and the South team used to regularly compete against touring sides from the Southern Hemisphere.

Many Borders clubs have helped train and nurture many of Scotland's current internationals.

== Touring sides ==
As many of the Border sides, most notably Melrose, Gala, Hawick, Selkirk and Jed Forest, produced many international players and even Lions, the South proved worthy competition for the touring sides from the Southern Hemisphere. The South twice drew with South African touring sides (1931–32 and 1969–70) and twice beat Australian touring teams (1966–67 and 1984–85).

Attendances at 'South' games often numbered well into the thousands (and a crowd of 10,000 attended the Rest of Scottish Districts versus All Blacks (New Zealand) match in 1972 at Hawick) and before the onset of professionalism, The South would often play touring national sides, such as Australia, New Zealand and South Africa before they played the national side

== Scottish Inter-District Championship ==
The Scottish Inter-District Championship began in season 1953–54.

The South competed in the annual Scottish Inter-District Championship, playing against the district teams of Glasgow District, Edinburgh District, North and Midlands and sometimes Anglo-Scots. The district championship was played in the autumn and provided a level of representative rugby above club competition but below the full Scottish national team. The best performing players were then picked for a large Scotland squad which would form around New Year, ready for the 5 Nations Championship. Often there was a "Red vs Blues" game at Murrayfield to decide the smaller squad.

- South v Glasgow 15 October 1968 match preview
- South v Glasgow 15 October 1968 match report
- South v Glasgow October 1973 preview
- South v Glasgow October 1974 preview
- South v Glasgow 23 October 1974 match preview

== Sevens tournament ==
The district used to run a Sevens tournament in April.

== Effect of professionalism ==
With the advent of professionalism after 1995, the Scottish Rugby Union realised that not even the best semi-professional Scottish club teams could compete in the new Professional Era in rugby union, which was beginning to gain great momentum in the professional leagues of the Southern Hemisphere and the Northern Hemisphere. In an attempt to stay in touch with the leading nations the Scottish Rugby Union (SRU) formed four professional teams, that would compete in the Heineken Cup and later a new Celtic League. These teams were based on the 4 former District Unions in Scotland, and a team now known as the Border Reivers began playing games in Galashiels and Hawick, the team wore the traditional white and red stripes, favoured by The South for their home games.

For subsequent history of professional teams representing the South of Scotland, see Border Reivers. However, the Border Reivers were amalgamated with Edinburgh to form the Edinburgh Reivers, who later dropped Reivers and are now known simply as Edinburgh Rugby. The Reivers were resurrected as "The Borders" in 2002, only to be disbanded in 2007.

== Amateur revival ==
The South team itself was revived in December 2009 for a game with Northumberland which the South won 37–3 and in the 2011–12 season beat the Barbarians 22–15 at Hawick. It now plays in the revived Amateur Scottish Inter-District Championship.

Renewed hope for a professional rugby team in the Borders came when Sir Moir Lockhead, the Chairman of the SRU, declared in May 2012 that "the Irish model is what we are trying to replicate now". The Irish model has four Provinces, much like the four Districts of Scotland in the early professional years, implying a return for the South/Borders and North/Caledonia.

== Rebirth of the amateur district ==
The South of Scotland District as an amateur district, returned in the 2022–23 Amateur Scottish Inter-District Championship. Its Head Coach is Matty Douglas, of Hawick, aided by assistant coaches Andrew Clark (Musselburgh), Iain Chisholm (Peebles) and Robert Grigg (Melrose Rugby).

Douglas noted:

It’s great to be given the opportunity to lead the South as Head Coach. The competition is steeped in tradition, and I know how much the South means to a lot of people. To have the Inter-district back gives the top players in the Premiership and National leagues an opportunity to showcase their ability and push for Scotland Club XV selection in the future. We have a great coaching team selected along with a fantastic management team in the background. I know we will all work hard to make sure we give the South the time and effort it deserves.

== Honours ==
The South won the Scottish Inter-District Championship 17 times outright, more than any other District.

In addition, it also shared the Championship with other Districts 10 times.

=== Season standings ===
==== Scottish Inter-District Championship ====
For the South's professional championship results from 1996 see Border Reivers.

Scottish Inter-District Championship

Season	Pos	Pld	W	D	L	F	A	+/-	BP	Pts	Notes
1953–54	2nd	3	2	0	1	39	22	+17	-	4	
1954–55	1st	3	3	0	0	35	14	+21	-	6	
1955–56	4th	3	0	1	2	17	25	-8	-	1	
1956–57	1st=	3	2	0	1	46	14	+32	-	4	Shared with Edinburgh
1957–58	1st=	3	2	1	0	55	23	+32	-	5	Shared with Edinburgh
1958–59	1st=	3	2	0	1	37	13	+24	-	4	Shared with Edinburgh
1959–60	1st=	3	2	0	1	58	22	+36	-	4	Shd with North and Midlands & Edinburgh
1960–61	2nd	3	2	0	1	51	31	+20	-	4	
1961–62	1st=	3	2	1	0	30	9	+21	-	5	Shared with Edinburgh
1962–63	2nd	3	2	0	1	32	19	+13	-	4	
1963–64	1st	3	3	0	0	25	0	+25	-	6	
1964–65	1st=	3	2	0	1	32	23	+9	-	4	Shared with Glasgow
1965–66	1st	3	3	0	0	37	22	+15	-	6	
1966–67	1st	3	2	1	0	43	17	+26	-	5	
1967–68	1st=	3	2	0	1	53	32	+21	-	4	Shared with Edinburgh and Glasgow
1968–69	1st	3	3	0	0	49	27	+22	-	6	
1969–70	1st	3	2	1	0	49	29	+20	-	5	
1970–71	1st	3	3	0	0	33	18	+15	-	6	
1971–72	3rd	3	1	0	2	54	32	+22	-	2	
1972–73	4th	3	1	0	2	53	59	-6	-	2	
1973–74	2nd	3	2	0	1	51	34	+17	-	4	
1974–75	4th	3	1	0	2	29	35	-6	-	0	
1975–76	1st=	3	2	0	1	56	32	+24	-	4	Shared with Glasgow and Edinburgh
1976–77	1st	3	3	0	0	84	28	+56	-	6	
1977–78	1st=	3	2	0	1	57	34	+23	-	4	Shared with Glasgow & Edinburgh
1978–79	1st	3	3	0	0	60	22	+38	-	6	
1979–80	2nd	3	2	0	1	78	28	+50	-	4	
1980–81	1st	3	3	0	0	86	12	+74	-	6	
1981–82	1st=	4	3	1	0	93	52	+41	-	7	Shared with Edinburgh
1982–83	1st	4	4	0	0	94	34	+60	-	8	
1983–84	1st	4	4	0	0	114	30	+84	-	8	
1984–85	1st	4	4	0	0	94	42	+52	-	8	
1985–86	1st	4	4	0	0	74	32	+42	-	8	
1986–87	2nd	4	3	0	1	127	45	+82	-	6	
1987–88	2nd	4	3	0	1	115	32	+83	-	6	
1988–89	2nd	4	3	0	1	93	58	+35	-	6	
1989–90	4th	4	1	0	3	60	84	-24	-	2	
1990–91	1st	4	3	1	0	103	42	+61	-	7	
1991–92	1st	2	2	0	0	63	7	+56	-	4	Abbreviated tournament - no winner
1992–93	1st	4	3	0	1	60	33	+27	-	6	
1993–94	1st	2	2	0	0	65	27	+38	-	-	
1994–95	4th	4	1	1	2	61	81	-20	-	3	
1995–96	4th	4	2	0	2	80	82	-2	-	4	

===== Professional Era =====
The Amateur Scottish Inter-District Championship has been restarted twice in the professional era. The first restart was from 1999 to 2002; the second restart from the 2022-23 season.

Season	Pos	Pld	W	D	L	F	A	+/-	BP	Pts	Notes
1999–2000	2nd	3	2	0	1	112	83	+29	2	10	
2000–01	2nd	4	2	0	2	130	96	+34	4	12	
2001–02	1st	4	4	0	0	142	57	+85	2	18	
2022–23	2nd	2	1	0	1	80	49	31	3	7	Final

== Partial list of games played against international opposition ==
Year	Date	Opponent	Venue	Result	Score	Tour
1906	13 November	South Africa	Mansfield Park, Hawick	Loss	5–32	1906–07 South Africa rugby union tour
1931	31 October	South Africa	The Greenyards, Melrose	Draw	0–0	1931–32 South Africa rugby union tour
1935	12 October	New Zealand	Mansfield Park, Hawick	Loss	8–11	1935–36 New Zealand tour of Britain, Ireland and Canada
1952	19 January	South Africa	Mansfield Park, Hawick	Loss	3–13	1951–52 South Africa rugby union tour
1957	7 December	Australia	Mansfield Park, Hawick	Loss	6 - 12	1957–58 Australia rugby union tour of Britain, Ireland and France Report
1970	17 January	South Africa	Galashiels	Draw	3–3	1969–70 South Africa rugby union tour
1973	17 November	Argentina	Mansfield Park, Hawick	Draw	16–16	1973 Argentina tour of Ireland and Scotland
1975	2 December	Australia	Netherdale, Galashiels	Loss	6–10	1975–76 Australia tour of Britain and Ireland
1979	27 October	New Zealand	Mansfield Park, Hawick	Loss	3–19	1979 New Zealand tour of England, Scotland and Italy
1981	22 September	Romania	The Greenyards, Melrose	Loss	10–18	1981 Romania rugby union tour of Scotland
1982	18 September	Fiji	Mansfield Park, Hawick	Win	23–17	1982 Fiji tour of Great Britain and Canada
1983	29 October	New Zealand	Netherdale, Galashiels	Loss	9–30	1983 New Zealand tour of Scotland and England
1984	1 December	Australia	Mansfield Park, Hawick	Win	9–6	1984 Australia tour of Britain and Ireland
1986	17 September	Japan	The Greenyards, Melrose	Win	45–12	1986 Japan rugby union tour of Great Britain
1988	12 November	Australia	Mansfield Park, Hawick	Loss	4–29	1988 Australia tour of England, Scotland and Italy
1990	6 November	Argentina	Poynder Park, Kelso	Loss	10–13	1990 Argentina rugby union tour of British Isles
1993	10 November	New Zealand	Netherdale, Galashiels	Loss	5–84	1993 New Zealand rugby union tour of Britain

== See also ==
- Rugby union in the Scottish Borders
- Border Reivers
