= Midlands District (rugby union) =

Scottish district rugby union team

(Scotland) Midlands
- Full name: Midlands District
- Founded: 1881; 145 years ago

Midlands District was a select provincial amateur rugby union team that drew its players mainly from central east Scotland, roughly corresponding from around Stirlingshire, east to Fife and northwards to Perthshire and Angus. Historically the Midlands team played against other Scottish districts, and provided players to the North of Scotland

Often, the Midland and North Districts played in a trial match against one another to determine selection for the side.

After the start of the Scottish Inter-District Championship in 1953–54 season, the Midlands District complained to the Scottish Rugby Union that the North of Scotland District side which competed in that first championship had several Midlands players in its squad and that the Midlands should receive equal recognition for providing their players to the North of Scotland District team. The SRU agreed and the combined team became formally known as North and Midlands.

The amateur North and Midlands side evolved into the professional Caledonia Reds side in 1996; one year after rugby union allowed professionalism in 1995.

== Formation ==
North of Scotland played a Midlands District side on 17 December 1881. The match was shared 1 goal apiece, but it was noted that there were also 2 touch downs in favour of the Midlands side.

Dundee Institution F.P. played a Rest of Midlands side on 23 December 1882.

The Midlands District as a formal district rugby union began in 1889. It was originally called the Scottish Midland Counties Football Union.

It had a difficult birth. On its founding, the Scottish Northern Counties Football Union - as the North of Scotland District was then called - asked that the Midland Counties formally join the Northern Counties. The North of Scotland District had been founded two years before in 1887.

The Scottish Rugby Union proposed that this matter be decided amicably between the two unions.

This was not to be and matters came to a head following a dispute over a postponed match in 1892. The co-operation between the Unions broke and thus the Midlands District's independence was reinforced.

== Teams ==
The Midlands District team which played Glasgow District on 21 November 1984. Glasgow won the match 11–10.

Report

The North and Midlands Under 21 side played a Midlands District Under 21 side.

Report

The Midlands District played the North of Scotland for selection to the North of Scotland team that played in the 1953-54 Scottish Inter-District Championship.

The Midlands District side was itself selected after a trial match between Angus & Perth versus Fife.

== Sevens tournament ==
The District used to run an annual Sevens tournament.

== See also ==
- North of Scotland District
- North and Midlands
- Caledonia Reds
