= Hughenden, Glasgow =

Multi-sports venue in Glasgow, Scotland

Coordinates: 55°52′54″N 4°18′28″W

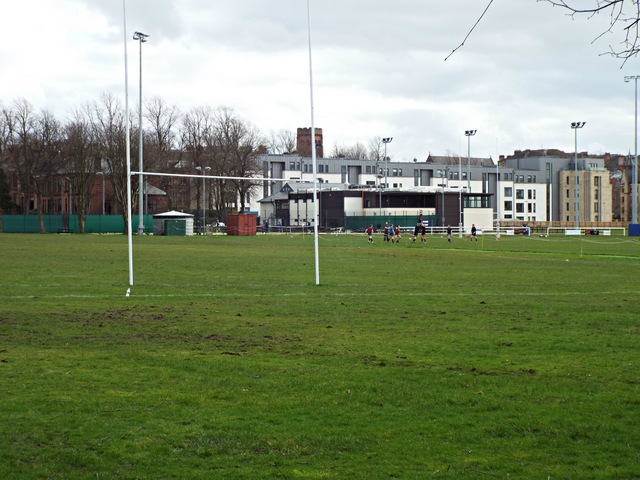
The Hughenden playing fields

Hughenden is a multi-sports venue in the Hyndland area of Glasgow, Scotland. It has been the home since 1924 of Hillhead Sports Club, a private members' club catering for cricket, rugby union and tennis. Hughenden is best known as a rugby venue and is the home ground of Hillhead Jordanhill RFC. It was also used as the home ground of the professional Glasgow Rugby team from 1996 to 2005 and again from 2006 to 2007. The main rugby ground has a capacity of 6,000.

== History ==
Hillhead Sports Club was formed in 1902 as a private club for former pupils of Hillhead High School, catering for various sports including football, cricket, hockey and athletics. A rugby team, Hillhead High School Former Pupils RFC (later Hillhead RFC), was formed in 1904. Initially the club used the Scotstoun Showgrounds before seeking to find a permanent home after the First World War, purchasing land at Hughenden in 1922. The club's new home, with its pavilion designed by W. Hunter McNab, was officially opened on 24 May 1924. Since then Hughenden has hosted a variety of sports including hockey, cricket and tennis, although it has been most closely associated with rugby. The first major sports tournament held at the club was the West of Scotland Tennis Championship in 1925.

Due to the growing popularity of the rugby team, a grandstand was built alongside the pitch in 1934, designed by local consulting engineers FA MacDonald. The stand was built of reinforced concrete with a cantilevered roof, unusual for the time. It was first used in September 1934, for a match between Hillhead and Glasgow Academicals. The ground had an upgrade of their floodlights in 1977.
