= List of Scottish Rugby Union presidents =

List of Scottish Rugby Union presidents is a list of people who have held the position of president of the Scottish Rugby Union and its predecessor the Scottish Football Union.

There is a discrepancy on the current official list over SRU presidents over the World War periods.

Tom Scott was president before and after the First World War. The official list states he was president for the 1914-15 season and 1919-20 season. Other sources have Scott as the president throughout the First World War.

In an omission, Patrick Munro is currently excluded from the official list of presidents altogether. Newspaper reports of the time state he was president. In addition, the Forsyth's Rugby Record state that Munro was president from 1939-1942; and that Harry Smith took over as acting president from 1942.

In this list we have taken Scott to be president throughout the First World War, added Patrick Munro and given Harry Smith the position from 1942, following the clarity of Forsyth's Rugby Record of the time.

Term no.	Name	Date
1	John Chiene	1873-74
2	Albert Harvey	1874-75
3	Benjamin Blyth II	1875-76
4	William Hamilton Kidston	1876-77
5	John Chiene	1877-78
6	George Raphael Fleming	1878-79
7	Angus Buchanan	1879-80
8	David Watson	1880-81
9	Alexander Petrie	1881-82
10	William Cross	1882-83
11	Gussie Graham	1883-84
12	Malcolm Cross	1884-85
13	Nat Brewis	1885-86
14	James Stewart Carrick	1886-87
15	William Sorley Brown	1887-88
16	Robert Bruce Young	1888-89
17	Andrew Ramsay Don-Wauchope	1889-90
18	Gordon Mitchell	1890-91
19	Thomas Ainslie	1891-92
20	David Morton	1892-93
21	Leslie Balfour-Melville	1893-94
22	Bill Maclagan	1894-96
23	Graham Findlay	1896-97
24	Robert Rainie	1897-98
25	John Boswell	1898-99
26	Ian MacIntyre	1899-1900
27	Robert MacMillan	1900-01
28	George Neilson	1901-02
29	Roger Davidson	1902-03
30	Robert Greig	1903-04
31	John Simpson	1904-05
32	Willie Neilson	1905-06
33	John Tulloch	1906-07
34	Andrew Flett	1907-08
35	David Cassels	1908-09
36	Alexander Blair	1909-10
37	Charles Fleming	1910-11
38	William Andrew Walls	1911-12
39	John Dallas	1912-13
40	James Greenlees	1913-14
41	Tom Scott	1914–20
42	John Dykes	1920-22
43	Herbert Dixon	1922-23
44	Robert Neilson	1923-24
45	Robert Campbell MacKenzie	1924-25
46	Robin Welsh	1925-26
47	James Aikman Smith	1926-27
48	Macbeth Duncan	1927-28
49	David McCowan	1928-29
50	Augustus Grant-Asher	1929-30
51	Andrew Balfour	1930-31
52	John Sturrock	1931-32
53	Crawford Findlay	1932-33
54	John MacGill	1933-34
55	Mark Coxon Morrison	1934-35
56	William Patrick Scott	1935-36
57	Alfred Lawrie	1936-38
58	William Halliday Welsh	1938-39
59	Patrick Munro	1939-42
60	Harry Smith	1942-47
61	Robert Scott	1947-48
62	James Moir Mackenzie	1948-49
63	Hamish Shaw	1949-50
64	Jimmie Ireland	1950-51
65	Dan Drysdale	1951-52
66	Frank Moffat	1952-53
67	Malcolm Allan	1953-54
68	John Bannerman	1954-55
69	Robert Meldrum	1955-56
70	Max Simmers	1956-57
71	Bob Hogg	1957-58
72	David MacMyn	1958-59
73	Ranald Cuthbertson	1959-60
74	David Kerr	1960-61
75	Robert Ledingham	1961-62
76	Andrew Stewart	1962-63
77	Herbert Waddell	1963-64
78	Ross Logan	1964-65
79	David Thom	1965-66
80	Mark Stewart	1966-67
81	Rae Tod	1967-68
82	Bill Nicholson	1968-69
83	George Crerar	1969-70
84	Robert Wilson Shaw	1970-71
85	Alex Brown	1971-72
86	Alfred Wilson	1972-73
87	Donny Innes	1973-74
88	Charlie Drummond	1974-75
89	John Henry Orr	1975-76
90	Hector Monro	1976-77
91	Frank Coutts	1977-78
92	Lex Govan	1978-79
93	Jimmy Ross	1979-80
94	Cliff Wilton	1980-81
95	Fraser MacAllister	1981-82
96	George Thomson	1982-83
97	Adam Robson	1983-84
98	Hamish Kemp	1984-85
99	George Burrell	1985-86
100	Doug Smith	1986-87
101	Bill Connon	1987-88
102	Tom Pearson	1988-89
103	Jimmy McNeil	1989-90
104	Charlie Stewart	1990-91
105	Gordon Masson	1991-92
106	Robin Charters	1992-93
107	Jock Steven	1993-94
108	Ken Smith	1994-95
109	Iain Todd	1995-96
110	Fred McLeod	1996-97
111	Charlie Ritchie	1997-98
112	Derek Brown	1998-99
113	Harvey Wright	1999-2000
114	Ian Laughland	2000-01
115	Robert Young	2001-02
116	Alan Hosie	2002-03
117	Bert Duffy	2003-04
118	Gordon Dixon	2004-05
119	Andy Irvine	2005-07
120	George Jack	2007-08
121	Jim Stevenson	2008-10
122	Ian McLauchlan	2010-12
123	Alan Lawson	2012-13
124	Donald Macleod	2013-14
125	Ian Rankin	2014-15
126	Ed Crozier	2015-16
127	Rob Flockhart	2016-18
128	Dee Bradbury	2018-20
129	Ian Barr	2020–22
130	Colin Rigby	2022–24
131	Keith Wallace	2024-present
