= Derek Brown (rugby union) =

Scottish rugby union player

- Born: George Derek Morton Brown; 23 December 1932 Melrose, Scotland
- Died: 12 July 2013 (aged 80) Melrose, Scotland
- School: Melrose Grammar School

Rugby union career
- Position: Number Eight
Amateur team(s)
| Years | Team | Apps | (Points) |
| 1948-65 | Melrose | | |
Provincial / State sides
| Years | Team | Apps | (Points) |
| - | South of Scotland District | | |
| - | Combined Scottish Districts | | |
International career
| Years | Team | Apps | (Points) |
- Barbarians

112th President of the Scottish Rugby Union
- In office 1998–1999
- Preceded by: Charlie Ritchie
- Succeeded by: Harvey Wright

Derek Brown (23 December 1932 - 12 July 2013) was a Scottish rugby union player. He was the 112th President of the Scottish Rugby Union.

== Rugby Union career ==
=== Amateur career ===
He went to school at Melrose Grammar School before going to Galashiels Academy.

Brown played for Melrose. He broke into the first team when aged 16. He became club captain. At the end of his career when Jim Telfer broke through at Melrose into the back row, Brown was moved into the second row. Telfer first played for Melrose in 1957 when Brown had the flu.

He father had been a player and committee member of Melrose.

=== Provincial career ===
He was capped for South of Scotland District.

He also played for the Combined Scottish Districts side.

=== International career ===
He travelled as a reserve for the Scotland national side. He was never called into action. He was in direct competition with Adam Robson of Hawick and Ken Smith of Kelso for a Scotland place.

He was capped by the Barbarians.

=== Administrative career ===
He was elected to the SRU general committee in 1984.

Brown became the 112th President of the Scottish Rugby Union. He served the standard one year from 1998 to 1999.

== Military career ==
He did his national service with the Royal Scots at the Glencorse Barracks. He shared a barrack room with the future Scotland football manager Ally MacLeod. He became a Corporal.

== Other interests ==
He ran his family joinery business, taking over when his father died. He was the fourth generation to take charge.

== Death ==
He battled cancer and arthritis for many years. He died in his bedroom, looking out to the Eildon Hills.

== Tributes ==
Jim Telfer:

Brown was a tireless forward. His main asset was his indefatigable spirit. He was a typical Border forward.

Peter Brown picked Brown in his best uncapped XV for Scotland:

All these years they brought folk up from London Scottish to be one-cap-wonders, and there was Derek sitting under their noses at Melrose being overlooked again and again. Anyone who played against him will vouch that he was the most combative guy, non-stop energy and just a terrific all-round player.
