= Dee Bradbury =

Scottish rugby union player & athlete

- Born: Dumbarton, Scotland

Rugby union career
- Position: Number Eight
Amateur team(s)
Years	Team	Apps	(Points)
-	Oban Lorne		

128th President of the Scottish Rugby Union
- In office 2018–2020
- Preceded by: Rob Flockhart
- Succeeded by: Ian Barr

Donalda Macintyre Maclay Bradbury OBE, known as Dee Bradbury, is a Scottish former rugby union player. She was the 128th President of the Scottish Rugby Union and was the first woman in that role.

== Rugby union career ==
=== Amateur career ===
Bradbury took up rugby union at the age of 38 after her athletics career finished. Watching the Mull Sevens tournament hooked her on the sport. She helped found the women's team of Oban Lorne and played in the team.

Bradbury stated: "Straight away we all had great fun and I will never forget our first tour to the Amsterdam Sevens when we came up against the Canada national side in our first match! The importance of playing rugby is underpinned by the values of discipline and engagement and those ethics can be applied to everyday life – the ethos of the game very important."

She played for a decade but a neck injury ended her playing career.

=== Administrative career ===
She became the President of Oban Lorne.

She was voted a Vice-President of the Scottish Rugby Union in 2016.

Bradbury became the 128th President of the Scottish Rugby Union in 2018. Her term in office was from 2018 to 2020.

The 127th person to be SRU president – John Chiene was the 1st and 5th president – Bradbury was the first female President of the SRU; and the first woman to head a Tier 1 rugby union nation in the world.

Bradbury was appointed Officer of the Order of the British Empire (OBE) in the 2021 New Year Honours for services to rugby union football.

She was inducted into the Scottish Rugby Hall of Fame in 2021.

== Outside of rugby union ==
Bradbury was a CID officer with Police Scotland.

She has an athletics background representing Scotland and Great Britain at junior and masters level.

== Family ==
Bradbury is married with two sons who both play rugby union. Magnus Bradbury is a Scotland international player.
