= Cliff Wilton =

Scottish rugby union player and executive

- Born: Clifford William Wilton
- School: Fettes College
- University: Gonville and Caius College, Cambridge

Rugby union career
- Position(s): Flanker, Lock
Amateur team(s)
Years	Team	Apps	(Points)
1935	Fettesian-Lorettonians		
1936-37	Cambridge University		
1937-38	London Scottish		
1937-38	Territorial Army XV		
1937-38	Northern		
1939	Services XV		
Provincial / State sides
Years	Team	Apps	(Points)
1937	Scotland Possibles		

94th President of the Scottish Rugby Union
- In office 1980–1981
- Preceded by: Jimmy Ross
- Succeeded by: Fraser MacAllister

Clifford William Wilton (15 March 1916 – 16 July 1987) was a Scottish rugby union player and businessman. He was the 94th President of the Scottish Rugby Union.

== Early life and education ==
Grandson of Sir Thomas Wilton, founder of Renwick Wilton & Co., coal merchants and travel agents, Clifford William Wilton was born in Newcastle upon Tyne and educated at Fettes College, then Gonville and Caius College, Cambridge (MA), and Gray's Inn, from where he was called to the Bar and thus qualified as a barrister.

== Business career ==
Wilton had a successful business career, becoming executive chairman of Renwick Wilton & Dobson (Holdings) Ltd and associated companies, and chairman of the Western Fuel Company.

== Rugby Union career ==
=== Amateur career ===
Wilton played rugby for Fettes College, After Fettes he played for Fettesian-Lorettonians in 1935. then for Caius College at the University of Cambridge; where he played for Cambridge University. While at Cambridge he was fined £5 for driving a sports car without insurance in October 1936. He scored a try against the University of Oxford in the 1936 match.

In 1937 he played for London Scottish. While based in Northumberland with the Territorial Army he also played for Northern.

He played for a Territorial Army XV in 1937 and 1938 and a Services XV in 1939.

=== Provincial career ===
He made the Scotland Possibles side in 1937.

=== Administrative career ===
He was Honorary Secretary of the Four Nations tour committee. He had to make a statement confirming that the tour to South Africa would be going ahead despite condemnation of the apartheid regime in 1961: 'We have great respect for the opinions of these different bodies, but so far as we are concerned our plans, which were made some time ago, are going ahead.'

Wilton was a member of the Scottish Rugby Union since 1964.

He was on the board of the IRB from 1972 to 1980.

Wilton became the 94th President of the Scottish Rugby Union. He served the standard one year from 1980 to 1981.

The Newcastle Journal had to apologise to Wilton on 12 June 1985 when they stated he had died. In fact, it was another past president of the Scottish Rugby Union Charlie Drummond who had died.

== Military career ==
He was a 2nd Lieutenant in the 72nd (Northumberland) Field Brigade of the Territorial Army in 1937. He later served with the Royal Artillery. In 1942-43 he was in an Italian Prisoner of War camp.

== Personal life ==
In 1939, Wilton married Alice Linda Travers, a tap dancer and former actress, sister to Bill Travers and Linden Travers. They had three daughters, the second of whom being the actress Penelope Wilton. He lived at 86, Lexham Gardens, Kensington, London W8, and was a member of the Constitutional Club, the City Livery Club, and the British Sportsman's Club. He died 16 July 1987.
