= Colin Rigby =

130th President of the Scottish Rugby Union

- Born: Colin Rigby Edinburgh, Scotland

Rugby union career
Amateur team(s)
| Years | Team | Apps | (Points) |
| - | Stewart's Melville | | |

130th President of the Scottish Rugby Union
- In office 2022–2024
- Preceded by: Ian Barr
- Succeeded by: Keith Wallace

Colin Rigby is a Scottish former rugby union player and referee. He was the 130th President of the Scottish Rugby Union; the 129th person to hold the office.

== Rugby Union career ==
=== Amateur career ===
Rigby played rugby at school. He went to Stewart's Melville College. At the age of 21 an injury ended his playing career and he moved into refereeing the game.

=== Administrative career ===
He became a president of Stewart's Melville from 2012 to 2015.

He became a chairman and director of the club from 2015 to 2018.

He was elected onto the Scottish Rugby Union council in 2017. He had three years on the SRU board from 2017 to 2020.

He was voted a vice-president of the Scottish Rugby Union in 2020.

Rigby became the 130th president of the Scottish Rugby Union in 2022. His term in office is scheduled to be from 2022 to 2024.

He is the third SRU president to be elected from Stewarts Melville, the other 2 Presidents being Fred McLeod and Lex Govan.

Rigby put in place a new governing structure for the SRU in 2022. He hailed it as a 'significant milestone'.

He was succeeded as president by Keith Wallace in November 2024.

== Business career ==
Rigby started in finance with Motorola, CTS Automotive, and Basilica Computing. He then moved into Operations and became first a director then Sales director of various companies. He is currently employed as an Account Development Manager at Civica.
