= Alex Brown (rugby union, born 1905) =

Scotland international rugby union player

- Born: Alexander Henderson Brown; 12 May 1905 Edinburgh, Scotland
- Died: 31 December 1986 (aged 81) Edinburgh, Scotland

Rugby union career
- Position: Fly-half
Amateur team(s)
Years	Team	Apps	(Points)
- Heriots
Provincial / State sides
Years	Team	Apps	(Points)
1928	Edinburgh District		
International career
Years	Team	Apps	(Points)
1928–29	Scotland	3	(7)

85th President of the Scottish Rugby Union
- In office 1971–1972
- Preceded by: Robert Wilson Shaw
- Succeeded by: Alfred Wilson

Alexander Henderson Brown (12 May 1905 – 31 December 1986) was a Scotland international rugby union player. He became the 85th President of the Scottish Rugby Union.

== Rugby Union career ==
=== Amateur career ===
Brown played for Heriots.

=== Provincial career ===
He was capped by Edinburgh District to play in the 1928 inter-city match.

=== International career ===
He played for Scotland 3 times in the period 1928 to 1929.

=== Administrative career ===
He became the 85th President of the Scottish Rugby Union. He served the standard one year from 1971 to 1972.
