= Frank Coutts (rugby union) =

Scotland international rugby union player

- Born: Francis Henderson Coutts; 8 July 1918 Glasgow, Scotland
- Died: 20 October 2008 (aged 90) Edinburgh, Scotland
- Notable relative(s): Walter Coutts, brother

Rugby union career
- Position: Lock
Amateur team(s)
Years	Team	Apps	(Points)
- Melrose
- Army
1948	C. R. Bruce XV		
-1949	London Scottish		
1949	Public School Wanderers		
1950	Co-Optimists		
1950	Glasgow Academicals		
Provincial / State sides
Years	Team	Apps	(Points)
1946-47	Scotland Probables		
1950	Kent		
International career
Years	Team	Apps	(Points)
1947	Scotland	3	(0)

91st President of the Scottish Rugby Union
- In office 1977–1978
- Preceded by: Hector Monro
- Succeeded by: Lex Govan

Frank Coutts (8 July 1918 – 20 October 2008) was a Scotland international rugby union player. He became the 91st President of the Scottish Rugby Union.

== Rugby Union career ==
=== Amateur career ===
Coutts played for Melrose and the Army.

He played for the Army against a 'Rest of Scotland' side on 15 February 1947.

He played a charity match on 17 April 1948. This was C.R. Bruce's over-25 select XV against H. Waddell's under-25 select XV. This was in aid of the Glasgow Academy building fund and it drew the largest crowd of the season at New Anniesland. The match was won by H. Waddell's XV by 21-15. Coutts played well for the C.R. Bruce XV kicking a penalty and a conversion.

He played for the Public School Wanderers in August 1949.

He was playing for London Scottish till the end of December 1949. He was then posted back with the army to Edinburgh district. However on the move back to Scotland, Coutts made arrangements to play for Glasgow Academicals.

He played for the Co-Optimists on 4 October 1950 against South of Scotland District.

He played for Glasgow Academicals in 1950.

=== Provincial career ===
He played for Scotland Probables in the 1946 December trial match; and in the January 1947 second trial match that season.

He travelled 400 miles from Edinburgh to play for a Kent county side against Eastern Counties on 4 January 1950. It was the deciding match in the South-Eastern division of the English county championship.

=== International career ===
Coutts played for Scotland in war-time internationals when at Melrose.

He played for Scotland 3 times in 1947.

=== Administrative career ===
Coutts was SRU Vice-President in 1976.

He became the 91st President of the Scottish Rugby Union. He served the standard one year from 1977 to 1978.

During his presidency, the SRU accepted a £80,000 sponsorship from Schweppes in a 3 year deal. The winners of each of the 7 national divisions will receive a Schweppes Trophy. However Coutts said that the SRU frowned on sponsorship in general and had refused a building society when they wanted to sponsor the Melrose Sevens.

== Military career ==
Coutts was a Colonel with the King's Own Scottish Borderers.

Coutts became a Brigadier in the army.

He became a general secretary of the Royal British Legion in Scotland.

== Family ==
His mother Rose Coutts lived till she was 100, dying a week short of her 101st birthday, in August 1987.

Coutts had 3 brothers and a sister. One of them was knighted as Sir Walter Coutts.

Another brother, Captain J. Burnaby 'Ben' Coutts, was a radio and TV broadcaster and an author of books on agriculture.

His grandfather Sir John Fleming was an Aberdeen M.P. and Lord Provost of the city.
