= Jim Stevenson (rugby union) =

Former President of the Scottish Rugby Union

- Born: Jim S. Stevenson c.1956 (age 69–70)

Rugby union career
Amateur team(s)
Years	Team	Apps	(Points)
- Rutherglen
–	Cambuslang		
–	Dalziel		

121st President of the Scottish Rugby Union
- In office 2008–2010
- Preceded by: George Jack
- Succeeded by: Ian McLauchlan

Jim Stevenson is a Scottish former rugby union player. He was the 121st President of the Scottish Rugby Union.

== Rugby Union career ==
=== Amateur career ===
Stevenson started with Rutherglen.

He played for Cambuslang.

He then played for Dalziel.

=== Administrative career ===
He has represented both Glasgow District and Lanarkshire.

He was a president of Cambuslang.

Stevenson became the 121st President of the Scottish Rugby Union. He served two years from 2008 to 2010.

Stevenson had tried to be President the year before, running against George Jack and Peter Brown in the first ever three way vote for the presidency. Stevenson lost out to Jack in the final round of voting; by 91 votes to 75 votes.

Jack then decided to put himself forward for another year as president. Stevenson decided to run again for the top post. One of Jack's aims for another year was to scrap the Scottish Cup. Stevenson was dead against this and argued that the Scottish Cup was a highlight of the club season. A number of clubs were opposed to Jack's idea and backed Stevenson. Stevenson won the vote by 95 votes to 86; and thus became president.

Stevenson decided to run again and go for his second year as president in 2009. This time he was up against the former Scotland captain Finlay Calder and Jim Gracie of Alloa. In the first round Calder secured 82 votes, Stevenson 81 votes and Gracie 16 votes. This meant for the second and final round of voting that Gracie dropped out. The final vote was Stevenson 92 votes and Calder 87 votes; and Stevenson remained president for the subsequent year.

Stevenson said:

"I’m just delighted. I never expected it to be anything other than very, very close. Finlay Calder is an iconic figure within Scottish Rugby, while Jimmy Gracie is someone who’s worked hard behind the scenes for many years. To beat them is amazing. I lost on the first vote 82-81 to Finlay Calder. Jim Gracie dropped out and I then won on the second vote. It was the Midlands vote that came to me which swung it. I was delighted as I’d just arrived back in Scotland at 1.30pm on the Friday from the Lions tour in South Africa, went home, showered, and went through to Murrayfield. I’ve had messages of congratulations from all over Scotland, the rest of the UK, and some international messages, such as from Australia and South Africa. It’s been really, really wonderful, as all the grassroots clubs have voted for me and it’s really touching. Afterwards, I went back to Cambuslang to have a wee celebration with others at the club. Then, when I got home, had a wee shindig with my wife Ellen, son James and his girlfriend.”

== Outside of rugby union ==
For many years he worked for with Glasgow City Council.

Stevenson is a manager of Walkerweld Engineering of Cambuslang.
