= David MacMyn =

British Lions & Scotland international rugby union player

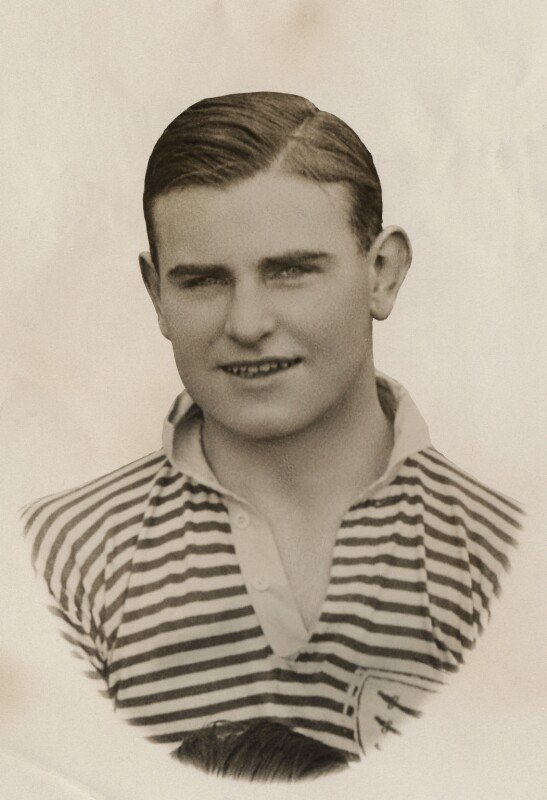
- MacMyn in 1925
- Born: David James MacMyn; 18 February 1903 Kirkcudbright, Scotland
- Died: 16 March 1978 (aged 75) Kirkcudbright, Scotland
- School: Fettes College
- University: Pembroke College, Cambridge

Rugby union career
- Position: Lock
Amateur team(s)
| Years | Team | Apps | (Points) |
- Cambridge University
| 1927-31 | London Scottish | | |
| – | King's College Hospital | | |
Provincial / State sides
| Years | Team | Apps | (Points) |
| 1928 | Anglo-Scots | | |
International career
| Years | Team | Apps | (Points) |
| 1925-1928 | Scotland | 11 | (6) |
| 1927 | British and Irish Lions | 0 | (0) |

72nd President of the Scottish Rugby Union
- In office 1958–1959
- Preceded by: Bob Hogg
- Succeeded by: Ranald Cuthbertson

David James MacMyn TD, BA, MB, BCHIR (18 February 1903 – 16 March 1978) was a rugby union international who represented Scotland from 1925 to 1928, later becoming the 72nd president of the Scottish Rugby Union. He also practiced as a surgeon.

== Early life ==
MacMyn was born on 18 February 1903 at Kirkcudbright, the son of a doctor. He was educated at Kirkcudbright Academy, then Fettes College from 1916 where he was assigned to Glencorse House. He then went up to Pembroke College, Cambridge where his rugby ability developed at Fettes won him his blue as a freshman at Cambridge. He took the BA with honours in 1924 before studying medicine at King's College Hospital, London.

== Rugby union career ==
=== Amateur career ===
His club career had seen him play for Cambridge University, London Scottish and King's College Hospital.

=== Provincial career ===
MacMyn was picked for the Anglo-Scots for their match against North and South District on 22 December 1928.

MacMyn was capped and the Anglo-Scots won the match 22 - 11.

=== International career ===
MacMyn made his international debut on 24 January 1925 at Inverleith in the Scotland vs France match. Of the 11 matches he played for his national side, he was on the winning side on 10 occasions. He played his final match for Scotland on 2 January 1928 at Colombes in the France vs Scotland match.

In 1927, he was chosen to captain the British and Irish Lions tour to Argentina which was won by four Tests to nil.

=== Administrative career ===
After his playing career he remained involved in rugby and for many years he was also a Scottish selector with the Scottish Rugby Union.

He became the 72nd President of the Scottish Rugby Union. He served one year from 1958 to 1959.

== Medical career ==
In 1928 he graduated MB BChir at King's College Hospital. In 1932 he obtained a Rockefeller Travelling Fellowship in surgery, and he studied neurosurgery at the Mayo Clinic. He returned to London eighteen months later and having had difficulty in qualifying for the FRCS, he accepted a partnership in a West End general practice, abandoning a career in neurosurgery.

After his military career during and just after the Second World War, he joined his father in his long-established general practice at Kirkcudbright. His father, John MacMyn, died on 13 May 1948 aged 86. David succeeded him in running the practice. In 1959, he was elected a member of the Harveian Society of Edinburgh.

== Military career ==
MacMyn was in the Territorial Army and in 1928 became a Territorial RAMC officer. By September 1939 he had reached the rank of major and at the beginning of the Second World War was posted to a Field Ambulance in the 52nd (Lowland) Division, which he commanded soon afterwards. The division landed at St Malo and re-embarked at Cherbourg ten days later. The division then trained in Scotland for mountain warfare and in 1944 crossed the Channel once more. David was mentioned in dispatches for services in north-west Europe. He was ADMS to the 49th (WR) Division and so was with the occupation forces in Germany. Afterwards he served with the 3rd Division in Egypt and Palestine and in 1947 was demobilised with the rank of full colonel.

== Personal and later life ==
MacMyn was known to enjoy a number of hobbies including golf, troutfishing, rereading the classics, and his garden, in which he grew roses that were much admired. He retired in 1965 and maintained an active lifestyle, enjoying golf and bridge. In addition, his association with rugby never waned and even after a slight stroke in December 1976 he accompanied a Scottish touring team to Japan in July 1977. Just a fortnight before his death he was at Murrayfield to watch the Calcutta Cup. He never married. He died suddenly at Harbour Cottage, Kirkcudbright.
