= Bill Connon =

Scottish rugby union player

- Born: William Lewis Connon c.1922 Aberdeen, Scotland
- Died: 2000 (aged 77–78)
- Notable relative(s): Jacky Connon, father

Rugby union career
- Position: Forward
Amateur team(s)
Years	Team	Apps	(Points)
1940-50	Aberdeen GSFP		

101st President of the Scottish Rugby Union
- In office 1987–1988
- Preceded by: Doug Smith
- Succeeded by: Tom Pearson

Bill Connon was a Scottish rugby union player. He became the 101st President of the Scottish Rugby Union. He was also a golf administrator in the north-east of Scotland and organised the Northern Open tournament for a number of years.

== Rugby Union career ==
=== Amateur career ===
Connon went to Aberdeen Grammar School.

Connon played for Aberdeen GSFP.

=== Provincial career ===
Connon played in a trial match organised by North of Scotland District. They split teams into Maroon ('A') and Blue ('B') jerseys to play off for selection by the district to face the Midlands District in October 1949. Connon was reported by the Aberdeen Press and Journal to have scored 'a gem of a forward try' for the Maroons.

Despite that try he failed to make the XV for the North v Midlands match on 5 November 1949.

=== Administrative career ===
Connon became the 101st President of the Scottish Rugby Union. He served the standard one year from 1987 to 1988.

In a notable changeover he took over from another former Aberdeen Grammar school former pupil Doug Smith. Tom Pearson of Howe of Fife and Jimmy McNeill of Hutchesons GSFP were elected Vice-Presidents.

== Outside of rugby union ==
He was a solicitor in Aberdeen, becoming an advocate.

His father was Jacky Connon, an Aberdeen F.C. player of the post-First World War era.

He was a North-East District golf official. He was one of the main organisers of the Northern Open, together with Jack Hall.
