= Donald Macleod (surgeon) =

Scottish surgeon, sports medicine pioneer and rugby doctor

- Born: Donald A. D. Macleod; March 4, 1941 Selkirk, Scotland
- Died: 13 November 2022 (aged 81) Innerleithen, Scotland

Rugby union career
Amateur team(s)
Years	Team	Apps	(Points)
- Edinburgh Academicals

124th President of the Scottish Rugby Union
- In office 2013–2014
- Preceded by: Alan Lawson
- Succeeded by: Ian Rankin

Donald Macleod (4 March 1941- 13 November 2022) was a Scottish surgeon and was President of the Scottish Rugby Union (SRU) 2013–2014. He was the Scotland team doctor 1969–1995 and the SRU's medical adviser 1971–2003.

== Medical career ==
He worked as a consultant general surgeon at Bangour General Hospital, West Lothian from 1975 to 2001, and as associate postgraduate dean of surgery for south-east Scotland from 1993 to 2004. He was also an honorary professor of sports medicine at Aberdeen University from 1998 to 2003.

He was the Scottish rugby union team's doctor from 1969 to 1995 and their medical adviser from 1971 to 2003. He was also the British Lion' team doctor from 1983; and a member of the medical advisory committee of the International Rugby Board from 1977 to 2003.

He served as vice-president of the Royal College of Surgeons of Edinburgh from 2001 to 2004; chairman of the Intercollegiate Academic Board for Sports and Exercise Medicine from 1998 to 2003; president of the British Association of Sports and Exercise Medicine from 1995 to 2002; and from 2005 to 2008 was chair of the medical committee for the Glasgow 2014 Commonwealth games bid.

He received the British Association of Sport and Exercise Medicine's Sir Roger Bannister Medal in 2005.

== Rugby Union career ==
=== Amateur career ===
He played for Edinburgh Academicals.

=== Administrative career ===
He was a President of Selkirk rugby union club from 2009 to 2011.

He was elected vice-president of the Scottish Rugby Union in 2012.

He became the 124th President of the Scottish Rugby Union. He served the standard one year from 2013 to 2014.

It was during his presidency that a sponsorship deal with BT was secured. Macleod stated: 'Congratulations to the executive team on securing such a great deal for the whole of Scottish rugby. From Stornoway in the north to Selkirk in the south, this welcome investment comes as a very positive development for the entire game.'

In 2019, Macleod stood down from the committee of the Selkirk rugby club.

Macleod died at the age of 81 on 13 November 2022.
