= Ranald Cuthbertson =

Scottish rugby union player

- Born: Ranald Ker Cuthbertson; 20 August 1899 Edinburgh, Scotland
- Died: 28 December 1983 (aged 84) Edinburgh, Scotland
- School: Edinburgh Academy

Rugby union career
Amateur team(s)
Years	Team	Apps	(Points)
- Edinburgh Academicals

73rd President of the Scottish Rugby Union
- In office 1959–1960
- Preceded by: David MacMyn
- Succeeded by: David Kerr

Ranald Cuthbertson W.S. (20 August 1899 - 28 December 1983) was a Scottish rugby union player. He was the 73rd President of the Scottish Rugby Union.

== Rugby Union career ==
=== Amateur career ===
Cuthbertson went to Edinburgh Academy and graduated in 1916. He then played for Edinburgh Academicals.

=== Administrative career ===
Cuthberson was appointed Honorary Secretary of Edinburgh Academicals junior side in 1926, and took on the same role for the main team in 1932. He was also a director of the Infirmary Sevens in Edinburgh till 1934.

In 1936, Cuthertson was elected to the committee of the Scottish Rugby Union, replacing A. I. S. McPherson of Edinburgh Academicals. As a member of the committee, he travelled to Wales in 1939 with the Scotland international team for their match at Cardiff;, and to Dublin for their match against Ireland.

Cuthbertson acted as president of Edinburgh Academicals from 1948 to 1950.

He was on the board of the International Rugby Board in 1954, and in 1959 he became the 73rd President of the Scottish Rugby Union, a role he fulfilled for the standard term of one year.

== Outside of rugby union ==
After he left the Edinburgh Academy, Cuthbertson signed up to the Royal Fleet Auxiliary in 1917.

Cuthbertson played cricket for Edinburgh Academicals, and was also a noted angler.

Professionally, Cuthbertson was a lawyer, and a Writer to the Signet. He joined the firm Mackenzie, Innes and Logan before moving on to the board of Scottish Equitable Life Assurance Society. He was a director of the Floors Stud Company of Kelso, the firm that the Duke of Roxburghe used to maintain his estate; Floors Castle was on the Duke's estate.
