= International cricket in 1938 =

International cricket season

The 1938 International cricket season was from April 1938 to August 1938.

== Season overview ==
International tours
Start date	Home team	Away team	Results [Matches]			
Start date	Home team	Away team	Test	ODI	FC	LA
1 June 1938	England	England Rest	—	—	0–0 [1]	—
10 June 1938	England	Australia	1–1 [5]	—	—	—
16 July 1938	Scotland	Ireland	—	—	0–1 [1]	—
20 July 1938	Netherlands	Marylebone	—	—	0–0 [2]	—
31 July 1938	Netherlands	England	—	—	0–0 [3]	—

== June ==
=== Test Trial in England ===
Three-day match
No.	Date	Home captain	Away captain	Venue	Result
Match	1–3 June	Wally Hammond	Denys Wilcox	Lord's, London	Match drawn

=== Australia in England ===
The Ashes Test series
No.	Date	Home captain	Away captain	Venue	Result
Test 263	10–14 June	Wally Hammond	Donald Bradman	Trent Bridge, Nottingham	Match drawn
Test 264	24–28 June	Wally Hammond	Donald Bradman	Lord's, London	Match drawn
Test 264a	8–12 July	Wally Hammond	Donald Bradman	Old Trafford Cricket Ground, Manchester	Match abandoned
Test 265	22–25 July	Wally Hammond	Donald Bradman	Headingley Cricket Ground, Leeds	Australia by 5 wickets
Test 266	20–24 August	Wally Hammond	Donald Bradman	Kennington Oval, London	England by an innings and 579 runs

== July ==
=== Ireland in Scotland ===
Three-day Match
No.	Date	Home captain	Away captain	Venue	Result
Match	24–27 July	Alastair McTavish	James MacDonald	Hamilton Crescent, Glasgow	Ireland by 109 runs

=== MCC in Netherlands ===
Two-day match series
No.	Date	Home captain	Away captain	Venue	Result
Match 1	20–21 July	Not mentioned	Not mentioned	Haarlem	Match drawn
Match 2	23–24 July	Not mentioned	Not mentioned	The Hague	Match drawn

=== England in Netherlands ===
Two-day match series
No.	Date	Home captain	Away captain	Venue	Result
Match 1	31 Jul–1 August	PCG Labouchere	Craig Stanley	The Hague	Match drawn
Match 2	3–4 August	PCG Labouchere	Craig Stanley	Laren	Match drawn
Match 3	6–7 August	PCG Labouchere	Craig Stanley	Haarlem	Match drawn
