= Ed Crozier =

Scottish rugby union footballer and referee

- Born: Edward Andrew Crozier; November 1959 (age 66–67)
- University: University of Glasgow; Glasgow Caledonian University

Rugby union career
Amateur team(s)
Years	Team	Apps	(Points)
- Glasgow Academicals
–	West of Scotland		

126th President of the Scottish Rugby Union
- In office 2015–2016
- Preceded by: Ian Rankin
- Succeeded by: Rob Flockhart

Ed Crozier (born 1959) is a Scottish former rugby union player and referee. He was the 126th president of the Scottish Rugby Union (SRU). Outside of rugby union, he is a theatre, film, TV and radio drama producer.

== Rugby union career ==
=== Amateur career ===
He played for Glasgow Academicals and West of Scotland.

=== Referee career ===
Crozier is a grade 'A' rugby union referee and has been a Chairman of the Scottish Rugby Referees Association.

He refereed the SRU founders members match between Glasgow Academicals and West of Scotland in 2016.

=== Administrative career ===
He became a director of Whitecraigs from 1992 to 1994.

He became the president of Cartha Queens Park.

Crozier became the 126th president of the Scottish Rugby Union. He served one year in office from 2015 to 2016.

During his time as president the SRU gave out grants to clubs as part of their sustainability fund. Crozier stated: "The Club Sustainability Fund enables us to improve the infrastructure of the domestic game across Scotland through supporting clubs and their project ideas. Together with the BT sponsorship investment, we are helping to improve club facilities for grassroots rugby. We hope such investment will encourage more players and communities to get involved with their clubs to help create a rugby legacy within the domestic game."

== Arts career ==
Crozier has been a director of Scottish Opera since 2012. He is a former director of Culture and Sport Glasgow. From 2017 to 2018 he was a Director of Castlight.

Some of the productions he has either produced or executive produced are:- Rat Pack Confidential, Baby Doll, South Pacific, The Celtic Story and Bill Bryden's first world war epic The Big Picnic.
