= Rob Flockhart (rugby union) =

Scottish rugby union player

- Born: Rob W. Flockhart
- School: High School of Dundee
- University: University of Edinburgh

Rugby union career
Amateur team(s)
Years	Team	Apps	(Points)
- Boroughmuir
Coaching career
- Years: Team
- 1998-99: Scotland U21

127th President of the Scottish Rugby Union
- In office 2016–2018
- Preceded by: Ed Crozier
- Succeeded by: Dee Bradbury

Rob Flockhart is a Scottish former rugby union player. He was the 127th president of the Scottish Rugby Union (SRU).

== Rugby union career ==
=== Amateur career ===
Flockhart played for southwest Edinburgh club Boroughmuir. When opening the 2016 Melrose Sevens, as SRU president, he mentioned "happy memories of representing Boroughmuir in the tournament in the 1970s."

=== Coaching career ===
Flockhart coached the Scotland U21 side in 1998 and 1999.

=== Referee career ===
Flockhart has been a citing commissioner for Six Nations Championship matches.

He has acted as a citing commissioner for European Cup and Challenge Cup matches.

He has been a citing commissioner for the Pro12.

=== Administrative career ===
Flockhart became a vice-president of the Scottish Rugby Union in 2015, beating Ian Barr of Lasswade by four votes.

He then became the 127th president of the Scottish Rugby Union, serving the first two-year term in office from 2016 to 2018.

Upon his election as president Flockhart spoke of his interest in developing the club game and his desire to "make it more sustainable", praising the work of Mark Dodson and his executive team as "fantastic. It allows us, with the debt where it is, to start thinking about how we drive forward and sustain the domestic game in Scotland."

During Flockhart's presidency, the SRU received criticism for the way it handled the sacking of its Director of Rugby, Keith Russell (father of Scotland international Finn Russell) and for its introduction of 'Agenda 3', which created an Edinburgh-centric national professional league competition (the Super 6 had three of its six sides coming from the capital - and no sides from the cities of Glasgow, Aberdeen, Dundee or Inverness).

In his annual report address to the SRU delegates, Flockhart apologised for six weeks of events and stated "we will learn the lessons from the tribunal findings... in relation to our former director of domestic rugby Keith Russell... we will implement recommendations from the review undertaken by Lesley Thomson, Scotland's former solicitor general." Flockhart also acknowledged "the concern and uncertainty surrounding Agenda 3", defending it as "a response to a recognition by many of our clubs and those volunteers in them that change is needed if our game is to survive and flourish."

As his presidency was concluding, Flockhart spoke about the finances of the SRU: "The idea that we were so strung up with debt that it was difficult to do any forward planning until the debt was reduced means that the financial results allows us to show that we can handle debt and focus on future projects. There have been eight consecutive sell-outs at BT Murrayfield. 67,000 at the Samoa game. The performances of the Men's and Women's national teams, as well as Glasgow and Edinburgh, have all contributed to these recent figures; you don't get to turn over £57 million unless there are big crowds at the very biggest games and successful teams are at the root of that. The turnover means that we can fund better professional teams but more importantly, we can fund club investment and the intention is to put more and more into the domestic game. The three strands of Agenda 3 – the Finance, Performance and Participation – money is needed for all of these. When I was elected I promised that I would try and brings clubs to the forefront of everything that happened at BT Murrayfield, which I think there's no denying has been the focus. Clubs wanted change and that's what Agenda 3 has tried to produce."
