= Robert Young (rugby union) =

Scotland international rugby union player

- Born: Robert Graham Young; 13 September 1940 (age 86) Edinburgh, Scotland

Rugby union career
- Position: Scrum half
Amateur team(s)
Years	Team	Apps	(Points)
- Watsonians
Provincial / State sides
Years	Team	Apps	(Points)
1970	Edinburgh District		
International career
Years	Team	Apps	(Points)
1970	Scotland	1	(0)

115th President of the Scottish Rugby Union
- In office 2001–2002
- Preceded by: Iain Laughland
- Succeeded by: Alan Hosie

Robert Young (born 13 September 1940 in Edinburgh) is a former Scotland international rugby union player. He became the 115th President of the Scottish Rugby Union.

== Rugby Union career ==
=== Amateur career ===
Young played for Watsonians.

=== Provincial career ===
He played for Edinburgh District in the 1970–71 Scottish Inter-District Championship.

=== International career ===
He played for Scotland once, in 1970.

=== Administrative career ===
He became the 115th President of the Scottish Rugby Union. He served the standard one year from 2001 to 2002.
