= Robert Meldrum =

Scottish rugby union player

- Born: Robert Marr Meldrum c. 1890 Edinburgh, Scotland

Rugby union career
- Position: Forward
Amateur team(s)
Years	Team	Apps	(Points)
- Royal HSFP
1911	Dental Students		

69th President of the Scottish Rugby Union
- In office 1955–1956
- Preceded by: John Bannerman
- Succeeded by: Max Simmers

Lt. Col. Robert Meldrum was a Scottish rugby union player. He became the 69th President of the Scottish Rugby Union.

== Rugby Union career ==
=== Amateur career ===
Meldrum played for Royal HSFP.

While a dental student he turned out for a Dental Students XV.

A broken ankle put paid to his season in 1911-12.

=== Provincial career ===
Meldrum did not get a full cap for Edinburgh District. He did come close in 1911. Glasgow and Edinburgh each organised 'A' and 'B' sides to try and get their selection right for the famous inter-city match. The Edinburgh sides were not deemed 'A' and 'B' but instead Stripes and Plain colours. Meldrum was found in the 'Plain colours' side. The trial matches were held on 22 November 1911 at Hamilton Crescent.

Meldrum was not included in the line-up for the 1911 inter-city match. Either he failed to impress at the trial or the broken ankle injury he sustained that season ruled him out of selection.

=== Administrative career ===
From 1929 to 1936 he was President of Royal HSFP.

He was on the committee of the Scottish Rugby Union from 1939.

He became the 69th President of the Scottish Rugby Union. He served one year from 1955 to 1956.

== Military career ==
In the First World War, Meldrum started in the Royal Army Medical Corps as a Captain. He later transferred to the Honourable Artillery Company where he became a Lieutanent Colonel.

== Dentistry career ==
Meldrum became a dentist. He graduated with a LDS and a Doctorate.

== Family ==
He was the son of George Alexander Meldrum and Jessie Brown Marr. His daughter Aileen married the Honorable Robert Montieth of Tullibole Castle.
