= Malcolm Allan =

Scottish rugby union player and referee

- Born: Malcolm Alexander Allan; 6 April 1900 Glasgow, Scotland
- Died: 1974 (aged 73–74) Carlisle, England
- School: The Glasgow Academy
- Notable relative(s): David Allan, father

Rugby union career
- Position: Forward
Amateur team(s)
Years	Team	Apps	(Points)
-	Glasgow Academicals		
Provincial / State sides
Years	Team	Apps	(Points)
1921	Glasgow District		
1921	Scotland Possibles		
Refereeing career
Years	Competition		Apps
1931–48	Five Nations Championship		

67th President of the Scottish Rugby Union
- In office 1953–1954
- Preceded by: Frank Moffat
- Succeeded by: John Bannerman

Malcolm Allan (6 April 1900 – 1974) was a Scottish rugby union player. He became an international referee and the 67th President of the Scottish Rugby Union.

== Rugby Union career ==
=== Amateur career ===
Allan was captain of Glasgow Academy in 1915–16 and 1916–17. He was captain of the rugby union team and the cricket team.

He played for Glasgow Academicals.

=== Provincial career ===
He represented Glasgow District in the 1921 inter-city match.

He played for Scotland Possibles in the final trial match of 1921, scoring a try.

According to The Glasgow Herald it was Allan's lack of pace that denied him a Scotland cap.

=== Referee career ===
Allan was noted as a strict referee. One commentator writing of Allan's refereeing style wrote: ‘so woe betide anybody who persistently breaks the rules’.

He was an international referee. He refereed the Ireland versus Wales match in the 1931 Five Nations Championship. His last international match - the same fixture – was in 1948.

He refereed in the Scottish Unofficial Championship (1936).

On one occasion, when refereeing a match at Netherdale, after hearing taunts from the crowd – he stopped the match and walked over to the crowd and delivered a lecture on the ethics of sportmanship before resuming the game. This caused embarrassment for the Gala officials.

=== Administrative career ===
He was a Scottish Rugby Union committee member from 1931 and in 1950 he was acting as a selector – along with Herbert Waddell – for the Scotland international team.

He was elected vice president of the Scottish Rugby Union in 1952.

He was president of the Scottish Rugby Union for the period 1953 to 1954.

== Outside of rugby union ==
He played cricket for Glasgow Academicals.

He was best man to Max Simmers on his wedding in 1932.

He worked for the India Tyre factory in Inchinnan.

He later moved to Carlisle where he worked at Morton Sundour Fabrics. During the Second World War he was in the Home Guard; and captained the Home Guard XI cricket team.

== Family ==
His father David Allan played association football for Queen's Park and the Scotland international team.
