= John Simpson (rugby union) =

Scotland international rugby union player & referee

- Born: 2 September 1872 Polmont, Scotland
- Died: 11 January 1921 (aged 48) Edinburgh, Scotland

Rugby union career
- Position: Half Back
Amateur team(s)
Years	Team	Apps	(Points)
- Royal HSFP
Provincial / State sides
Years	Team	Apps	(Points)
1894	Edinburgh District		
International career
Years	Team	Apps	(Points)
1893-98	Scotland	11	(0)
Refereeing career
Years	Competition		Apps
1906	Home Nations		

31st President of the Scottish Rugby Union
- In office 1904–1905
- Preceded by: Robert Greig
- Succeeded by: Willie Neilson

John Simpson (2 September 1872 – 11 January 1921) was a Scotland international rugby union player. He later became an international referee and was the 31st President of the Scottish Rugby Union.

== Rugby Union career ==
=== Amateur career ===
Simpson played with Royal HSFP.

=== Provincial career ===
Simpson played for Edinburgh District against Glasgow District in the 1894 inter-city match.

=== International career ===
Simpson was capped eleven times for Scotland between 1893 and 1899. He was part of the Scotland side that won the Triple Crown in 1894-95 season.

=== Referee career ===
He refereed one international match in the 1906 Home Nations Championship; the Ireland v Wales match.

=== Administrative career ===
He became the 31st President of the Scottish Rugby Union. He served one year from 1904 to 1905.

== Medical career ==
Simpson became a doctor. He was a Fellow of the Royal College of Physicians of Edinburgh and a Fellow of the Royal College of Surgeons of Edinburgh.

== Death ==
He died on 11 January 1921, leaving a widow Margaret Lockhart Mitchell. His estate was valued at £5204, 19 shillings and 3d.
