= Keith Wallace =

Keith Wallace may refer to:

- Keith Wallace (wine writer)
- Keith Wallace (boxer)
- Keith Wallace (rugby union)
