= Alfred Wilson (rugby union) =

Scotland international rugby union player

Alf Wilson
- Born: Alfred William Wilson; 28 January 1904
- Died: 2 May 1985 (aged 81) Dunfermline, Scotland
- School: Dollar Academy

Rugby union career
- Position: Centre
Amateur team(s)
| Years | Team | Apps | (Points) |
- Dunfermline
Provincial / State sides
| Years | Team | Apps | (Points) |
| 1931 | Midlands District | | |
| 1931 | North of Scotland District | | |
International career
| Years | Team | Apps | (Points) |
| 1931 | Scotland | 3 | (0) |

Manager of the British Lions Rugby Union Team
- In office 1959–1959

86th President of the Scottish Rugby Union
- In office 1972–1973
- Preceded by: Alex Brown
- Succeeded by: Donny Innes

Lieutenant Colonel Alfred William Wilson CBE (28 January 1904 – 2 May 1985) was a Scotland international rugby union player. He managed the British Lions on their 1959 tour of Australia and New Zealand and became the 86th President of the Scottish Rugby Union during their centenary.

== Rugby Union career ==
=== Amateur career ===
Wilson played for Dunfermline.

=== Provincial career ===
Wilson captained the Midlands District against North of Scotland District on 7 November 1931 in a 22 - 0 defeat of the northern side.

His form meant he was selected for the combined North of Scotland District side for their match against South of Scotland District on 21 November 1921. The South won the match 30 - 9.

=== International career ===
He played for Scotland 3 times in 1931.

=== Administrative career ===
He managed the British Lions on their 1959 tour of Australia and New Zealand and became the 86th President of the Scottish Rugby Union during their centenary year. He served the standard one year from 1972 to 1973. He was appointed CBE in the 1974 Birthday Honours.
