= Tom Pearson (rugby union, born 1926) =

Scottish rugby union player

- Born: Tom Pearson; 4 October 1926 Gateside, Fife, Scotland
- Died: 14 September 2010 (aged 83) Leven, Fife, Scotland

Rugby union career
- Position: Scrum half / Flanker
Amateur team(s)
Years	Team	Apps	(Points)
-	Howe of Fife		

102nd President of the Scottish Rugby Union
- In office 1988–1989
- Preceded by: Bill Connon
- Succeeded by: Jimmy McNeil

Tom Pearson (4 October 1926 – 14 September 2010) was a Scottish rugby union player. He became the 102nd President of the Scottish Rugby Union.

== Career ==
Pearson became a P.E. teacher and also became an Assistant Rector at Buckhaven High School.

=== Rugby ===
Pearson was educated at Bell Baxter School in Cupar.

Pearson played and coached for Howe of Fife.

Pearson refereed rugby union matches.

=== Administrative career ===
Pearson was first elected to the SRU committee as the Midlands District representative in season 1969–1970.

Pearson was Chairman of the Scotland selection committee from 1976 to 1980.

Pearson helped to create the SRU coaching panel which installed a national technical director.

Pearson managed the Scotland tour to Japan in 1977.

Pearson suffered a heart attack in 1980 and stood down from the SRU. He recovered and carried on teaching till 1985 when he retired. He then joined the SRU again as youth convenor.

Pearson became the 102nd President of the Scottish Rugby Union. He served the standard one year from 1988 to 1989.

Pearson was a firm believer in progressing youth rugby and chaired a number of initiatives to develop youth participation.
