= Ian Rankin (rugby union) =

Scottish rugby union player

- Born: Ian T. Rankin

Rugby union career
Amateur team(s)
Years	Team	Apps	(Points)
-	Edinburgh Wanderers		
–	Howe of Fife		
Coaching career
- Years: Team
- Kirkcaldy
- North and Midlands
- Caledonia Reds
- Edinburgh Rugby
- Scotland 'A'
- Scotland U21
- 2007-08: Scotland Club XV
- 2008-11: Scotland Club XV (manager)
- 2003-13: Dundee HSFP

125th President of the Scottish Rugby Union
- In office 2014–2015
- Preceded by: Donald Macleod
- Succeeded by: Ed Crozier

Ian Rankin is a Scottish former rugby union player and now coach. He is also a former president of the Scottish Rugby Union (SRU). He has coached various clubs, among them: Caledonia Reds, Edinburgh Rugby, Scotland 'A', Scotland U21, Scotland Club XV and Dundee HSFP.

== Rugby union career ==
=== Amateur career ===
He played for Edinburgh Wanderers and Howe of Fife.

He won the Howe of Fife Sevens while with the Cupar club.

=== Coaching career ===
He began his coaching career at Kirkcaldy before coaching the North and Midlands district side. On professionalism this side became Caledonia Reds and Rankin coached the professional side. He led the Caledonia Reds to their first ever outright Scottish Inter-District Championship title - as the amateur or professional side - in 1996-97.

When the Reds side was disbanded in 1998, Rankin moved to coach Edinburgh Rugby.

He had various stints at Scotland coaching posts including Scotland 'A', Scotland U21 and Scotland Club XV.

He took over coaching at Dundee HSFP from the All Black player Jason Hewett.

=== Administrative career ===
He became the 125th president of the Scottish Rugby Union. He served the standard one year from 2014 to 2015.
