= John Orr (police officer, born 1918) =

Scotland international rugby union player

John Henry Orr
- Born: John Henry Orr; 13 June 1918 Edinburgh, Scotland
- Died: 27 September 1995 (aged 77) Edinburgh, Scotland
- School: George Heriot's School

Rugby union career
- Position: Flanker
Amateur team(s)
Years	Team	Apps	(Points)
- Edinburgh City Police
Provincial / State sides
Years	Team	Apps	(Points)
1946	Edinburgh District		
International career
Years	Team	Apps	(Points)
1947	Scotland	2	(0)

89th President of the Scottish Rugby Union
- In office 1975–1976
- Preceded by: Charlie Drummond
- Succeeded by: Hector Monro

Sir John Henry Orr OBE QPM (13 June 1918 – 26 September 1995) was a Scottish police officer and was the first Chief Constable of the Lothian and Borders Police. He was also a former Scotland international rugby union player.

== Police career ==
Orr became a clerk with the then Edinburgh City Police. After becoming a full police constable, he rose through the ranks and became Chief Constable of the former Lothians and Peebles Constabulary. Following a merger of three police forces on 16 May 1975, John Orr became the first Chief Constable of the newly created Lothian and Borders Police, serving in the post until 1983.

He was appointed an OBE in 1972, awarded the Queen's Police Medal (QPM) in 1977, and was made a Knight Bachelor in the 1979 Birthday Honours.

== Rugby Union career ==
=== Amateur career ===
Orr played for the Edinburgh City Police rugby team.

=== Provincial career ===
He played in the 1946 inter-city match for Edinburgh District.

=== International career ===
He played for Scotland twice in 1947.

=== Administrative career ===
He became the 89th President of the Scottish Rugby Union. He served the standard one year from 1975 to 1976.
