= Harvey Wright =

Scottish rugby union player

- Born: J. Harvey R. Wright
- School: High School of Dundee

Rugby union career
- Position: Number Eight
Amateur team(s)
Years	Team	Apps	(Points)
- Dundee HSFP
Provincial / State sides
Years	Team	Apps	(Points)
1964	Midlands District		
-	North and Midlands		

113th President of the Scottish Rugby Union
- In office 1999–2000
- Preceded by: Derek Brown
- Succeeded by: Ian Laughland

Harvey Wright is a Scottish former rugby union player. He was the 113th President of the Scottish Rugby Union.

== Rugby Union career ==
=== Amateur career ===
He played for and captained Dundee HSFP.

=== Provincial career ===
He played for Midlands District against North of Scotland District on 24 October 1964. The North won the match.

He was not selected for the subsequent North and Midlands match; but later he did go on to captain the side.

=== Administrative career ===
He became a selector for Midlands District in 1974.

Wright became President of Dundee HSFP. During the club's centenary year in 1980, Wright wrote in the centenary book that the Dundee club strived to play attractive open rugby.

Wright became the 113th President of the Scottish Rugby Union. He served the standard one year from 1999 to 2000.

== Other interests ==
He played tennis and was a beaten finalist in the Midlands boys' singles tournament at Broughty Ferry Games Club in 1955.
