= Hamish Shaw =

Scotland international rugby union player

- Born: James Norrie Shaw; 13 September 1896 Edinburgh, Scotland
- Died: 10 November 1990 (aged 94) Coldstream, Scotland

Rugby union career
- Position: No. 8
Amateur team(s)
Years	Team	Apps	(Points)
- Edinburgh Academicals
Provincial / State sides
Years	Team	Apps	(Points)
1920	Edinburgh District		
International career
Years	Team	Apps	(Points)
1921	Scotland	2	(0)

63rd President of the Scottish Rugby Union
- In office 1949–1950
- Preceded by: James Moir Mackenzie
- Succeeded by: Jimmie Ireland

Hamish Shaw (13 September 1896 - 10 November 1990) was a Scotland international rugby union player. He became the 63rd President of the Scottish Rugby Union.

== Rugby Union career ==
=== Amateur career ===
He played for Edinburgh Academicals.

=== Provincial career ===
He played for Edinburgh District in the 1920 inter-city match.

=== International career ===
He received two caps for Scotland both in 1921.

=== Administrative career ===
He was President of the Scottish Rugby Union for the period 1949 to 1950.
