= David Kerr (rugby union) =

Scotland international rugby union player

- Born: David Simpson Kerr; 3 February 1899 Edinburgh, Scotland
- Died: 6 March 1969 (aged 70) Edinburgh, Scotland

Rugby union career
- Position: Prop
Amateur team(s)
Years	Team	Apps	(Points)
- Heriots
Provincial / State sides
Years	Team	Apps	(Points)
1923	Edinburgh District		
International career
Years	Team	Apps	(Points)
1923–28	Scotland	10	(6)

74th President of the Scottish Rugby Union
- In office 1960–1961
- Preceded by: Ranald Cuthbertson
- Succeeded by: Robert Ledingham

David Kerr (3 February 1899 – 6 March 1969) was a Scotland international rugby union player. He became the 74th President of the Scottish Rugby Union.

== Rugby union career ==
=== Amateur career ===
He played for Heriots.

=== Provincial career ===
He played for Edinburgh District in the 1923 inter-city match.

=== International career ===
He received 10 caps for Scotland from 1923 to 1928.

=== Administrative career ===
He was President of the Scottish Rugby Union for the period 1960 to 1961.

== Military career ==
In the First World War he joined the 2nd Battalion Argyll and Sutherland Highlanders as a 3rd Lieutenant. He went to France on 20 October 1918.
