= George Jack =

George Jack may refer to:

- George Jack (architect) (1855–1931), British Arts and Crafts designer and architect
- George Jack (rugby union), Scottish former rugby union player
- George W. Jack (1875–1924), United States district judge
