= Leith RFC =

Scottish rugby union club, based in Edinburgh

(Scotland) Leith Rugby
- Full name: Leith Rugby
- Union: Scottish Rugby Union
- Location: Leith, Edinburgh, Scotland
- Region: Edinburgh
- Ground: Leith Academy
- President: (Scotland) Jim Smith
- Coach: (Scotland) Kevin Greenan
- Captain(s): (Scotland) Neil Patterson (Club) (Scotland) Neil Patterson (1st XV) (England) Will Tuft (2nd XV)
- Top scorer: (Scotland) Kenny Dannfald (17 tries)
- League: East Division Two
- 2025–26: East Division Two, 5th of 7
Team kit

Official website
- www.pitchero.com/clubs/leithrfc

Leith Rugby, formerly known as Leith Academicals or Leith Accies, is a rugby union club in Leith, Edinburgh, Scotland.

== History ==
Leith's first rugby team was formed in 1905 and played at the Quarryholes. The first incarnation was not successful however and disbanded in 1912, because most of the players had emigrated.

In 1921, the Leith Academicals Rugby Football Club was formed through a grant from the Leith Academy F.P. (Former Pupils) Association on the condition that members must be former pupils of Leith Academy and members of the F.P. Association. The new club's first fixture was against the School with the Academy team winning 12–3.

After establishing a regular first team, the club moved to play at Hawkhill, Leith which had been its base right up until 1998. There were, of course, no bar facilities, and changing accommodation was difficult. Players changed in a wooden ex-army hut which had no lights, no toilets and no water, and washing for all players was at a single cold water tap at an outside stand-pipe. Annual subscription was seven shillings and sixpence (37.5p) for full members and half-a-crown (12.5p) for under-18s. There was a match levy of sixpence (2.5p). Players had to supply all their own kit and pay traveling expenses.

The club gained in strength and in the 1930s was Scotland's outstanding 'Junior Club', emphasised by the inclusion of seven Leith Accies in Junior inter-city games against Glasgow and the South. Progress beyond this level was not achieved due to lack of attendance by Scottish selectors and so, on one occasion, the seven Leith Accies called off from a representative game and played for the club. Two members, Jack Crawford and J.B.R Adam, were called to the North British Hotel where they were severely reprimanded and warned that any repetition would lead to the club being banned from all competitions. Despite the lack of selectorial interest the club did gain two international caps through J.A.T. Brown, an outstanding coach and captain: regrettably the caps were for cricket and table-tennis!

For 2007, the President of the Scottish Rugby Union, George Jack, was an ex-player.,

A successful 2011–12 season saw the club finish in second place, sadly without promotion due to league reconstruction, but the club were not to be denied and in 2012–13 the league title was secured with 16 wins from 18 matches, 109 tries scored, and with the best defence in all the RBS East leagues. David Robertson top scored with 17 tries, and captain and stand-off Doug Watters led the points table with 164. Season 2013–14 saw the club back in East League 2.

Leith finished the 17/18 season in 7th place in East League 2 after a slow start to the campaign. However results improved towards the latter end of the season and the Leithers were able to win their last 5 games in a row.

A new coach, Kevin Greenan, formerly of Forrester Rugby Club, has been appointed for season 18/19 as the Leithers hope to improve on last season and fight for promotion.

The club plays its home games at Leith Academy School, Academy Park, Leith, Edinburgh, Scotland.

== Honours ==
- Peebles Sevens
  - Champions (2): 1935, 1973
