= Charles Ritchie =

Charles Ritchie may refer to:

- Charles Ritchie (diplomat) (1906–1995), Canadian diplomat and diarist
- Charles Ritchie (priest) (1887–1958), Anglican clergyman
- Charles Ritchie, 1st Baron Ritchie of Dundee (1838–1906), British businessman and Conservative politician
- Charles Burton Ritchie, American filmmaker and entrepreneur

== See also ==
- Charlie Ritchie (1933–2008), Scottish rugby union player
