= Iain Laughland =

Scotland international rugby union player (1935–2020)

- Born: Iain Hugh Page Laughland; 29 October 1935 Bombay, British India
- Died: 9 August 2020 (aged 84)
- School: Merchiston Castle School

Rugby union career
- Position: Centre
Amateur team(s)
Years	Team	Apps	(Points)
- London Scottish
- Harlequins
1965	Co-Optimists		
Provincial / State sides
Years	Team	Apps	(Points)
1959-61	Scotland Probables		
International career
Years	Team	Apps	(Points)
1959-67	Scotland	31	(9)

114th President of the Scottish Rugby Union
- In office 2000–2001
- Preceded by: Harvey Wright
- Succeeded by: Robert Young

Iain Hugh Page Laughland (29 October 1935 – 9 August 2020) was a Scottish international rugby union player.

== Rugby Union career ==
=== Amateur career ===
Born in Mumbai, Laughland was educated until the age of 9 in the Himalayas. He then went to Merchiston Castle School in Edinburgh and played for the school team.

He played for London Scottish. Laughland captained London Scottish for five successive years winning the Middlesex Sevens tournament each year of his captaincy. He was noted as the architect of the game, changing the play by slowing down to a walking pace, his team showing excellent ball skills and patience before bursting through defences with agility and speed.

Laughland then played for Harlequins. He also toured South Africa and Australia on invitation with Harlequins.

He played for the Co-Optimists against London Welsh in 1965.

=== Provincial career ===
He played for Scotland Probables in 1959 and 1961. A barbarian saw Laughland captain the side against winning against New Zealand in 1967 and on many other occasions embracing the spirit of the invitation game.

=== International career ===
Laughland played for Scotland and was capped 31 times between 1959 and 1967. He played fly half and centre, taking over from Gordon Waddell.

Laughland captained Scotland for the last two years of his playing career, winning the Calcutta cup on two occasions at both Twickenham in 1964 and Murrayfield Stadium in 1965.

His greatest regret was turning down the opportunity to Captain the Lions in 1965 on their tour to New Zealand due to injury. The mantle was passed to Mike Campbell-Lamerton.

Bill McLaren says of a game against South Africa in 1960:

The Scottish try was a typical opportunist effort by Scotland's captain Arthur Smith. Iain Laughland (London Scottish) operating at stand-off, tried a drop-goal after John Douglas (Stewarts College F.P.), Norman Bruce (London Scottish) and Hugh McLeod (Hawick) had rolled out of the back of a line-out. The ball sliced off Laughland's foot, but Arthur Smith, purring as always like a high powered Rolls-Royce, screamed up the wing like a shell and got the touch before the ball rolled out of play... The match was marked by some magnificent Scottish tackling in which the mid-field of Laughland, Eddie McKeating (Heriots F.P.), and George Stevenson (Hawick) set a superb example, that deprived a South African threequarter line comprising Janie Engelbrecht, Ian Kirkpatrick, John Gainsford and Hennie van Zyl of a try; some feat considering that those four contributed 38 tries during the tour.

McLaren also paid Laughland the accolade of selecting him as his fly half and captain for the all-time greatest Scottish side from those who played between 1950 and 2003.

=== Administrative career ===
Laughland continued his support of Rugby Union from the sidelines, running the Anglo Scots side for many years. He became President of the Scottish Rugby Union in 2000–01.

== Outside of rugby union ==
His business career saw him heading up Benn Brothers Publications, an international magazine publisher. The company was sold to Excel PLC in 1999 by the remaining Benn family, who had left the helm many years prior.

Other interests included golf where as a long-standing member of Rye Golf Club, Sussex, he played to a 3 handicap. Other sporting achievements include captaining Scotland School boys at Cricket (1953) and playing for Nairn County Football Club whilst stationed as a Lieutenant with the Sea Forth Highlanders. National service took Laughland to Suez Crisis in Aden from 1956 to 1958 whilst the regiment was stationed at Nairn.

He died on 9 August 2020 at the age of 84.
