= James MacKenzie (rugby union) =

Scotland international rugby union player

Moir Mackenzie
- Born: James Moir Mackenzie; 17 October 1886 Sunderland, England
- Died: 22 January 1963 (aged 76) Chichester, England

Rugby union career
- Position: Forward
Amateur team(s)
Years	Team	Apps	(Points)
- Edinburgh University
Provincial / State sides
Years	Team	Apps	(Points)
1906	Edinburgh District		
1911	Blues Trial		
International career
Years	Team	Apps	(Points)
1905-11	Scotland	9	(0)

62nd President of the Scottish Rugby Union
- In office 1948–1949
- Preceded by: Robert Scott
- Succeeded by: Hamish Shaw

Sir James Moir MacKenzie KBE, CMG (17 October 1886 – 22 January 1963) was a Scotland international rugby union player and later director of the Federation of British Industries. He was the 62nd President of the Scottish Rugby Union.

== Rugby union career ==
=== Amateur career ===
He played for Edinburgh University.

=== Provincial career ===
He played for Edinburgh District in the inter-city match of 1906.

He played for the Blues Trial side against the Whites Trial side on 21 January 1911 while still with Edinburgh University.

=== International career ===
He was capped nine times for Scotland between 1905 and 1911.

=== Administrative career ===
He was President of the Scottish Rugby Union for the period 1948 to 1949.
