= George Burrell (rugby union) =

Scotland international rugby union player

- Born: 21 January 1921 Galashiels, Scotland
- Died: 28 July 2001 (aged 80) Melrose, Scotland
- School: Galashiels Academy

Rugby union career
- Position: Full-back
Amateur team(s)
Years	Team	Apps	(Points)
- Gala
–	6th Bat. KOSB		
Provincial / State sides
Years	Team	Apps	(Points)
- South of Scotland District
International career
Years	Team	Apps	(Points)
1950-51	Scotland	4	(0)
Refereeing career
Years	Competition		Apps
1958-59	Five Nations Championship		2

99th President of the Scottish Rugby Union
- In office 1985–1986
- Preceded by: Hamish Kemp
- Succeeded by: Doug Smith

George "Dod" Burrell (21 January 1921 – 28 July 2001) was a Scotland international rugby union player. He later became an international referee and president of the Scottish Rugby Union.

== Rugby union career ==
=== Amateur career ===
He played club rugby for Gala.

During the Second World War he played for the 6th Battalion of the King's Own Scottish Borderers, his army side. He captained the squad and they won the British Army championship title.

=== Provincial career ===
He played for South of Scotland District.

=== International career ===
Burrell was capped four times as a full-back for Scotland between 1950 and 1951.

=== Referee career ===
On retiring from playing he took up refereeing and refereed two international matches – one each in the 1958 Five Nations Championship and 1959 Five Nations Championship.

=== Administrative career ===
He was assistant manager of the 1970 Scotland tour to Australia and took over as manager when Hector Monro had to return to Britain to fight a general election.

Burrell also managed the 1975 Scotland rugby union tour of New Zealand and the 1977 British Lions tour to New Zealand.

Burrell joined the SRU committee and served from 1968 to 1986.

He was President of the Scottish Rugby Union in 1985–86.

== Military career ==
He served with the King's Own Scottish Borderers during the Second World War. He was wounded in Normandy in 1944.

He was a company sergeant in the mortar platoon.

== Death ==
He died at the Borders General Hospital in Melrose.
