= Doug Smith (rugby union) =

British Lions & Scotland international rugby union player

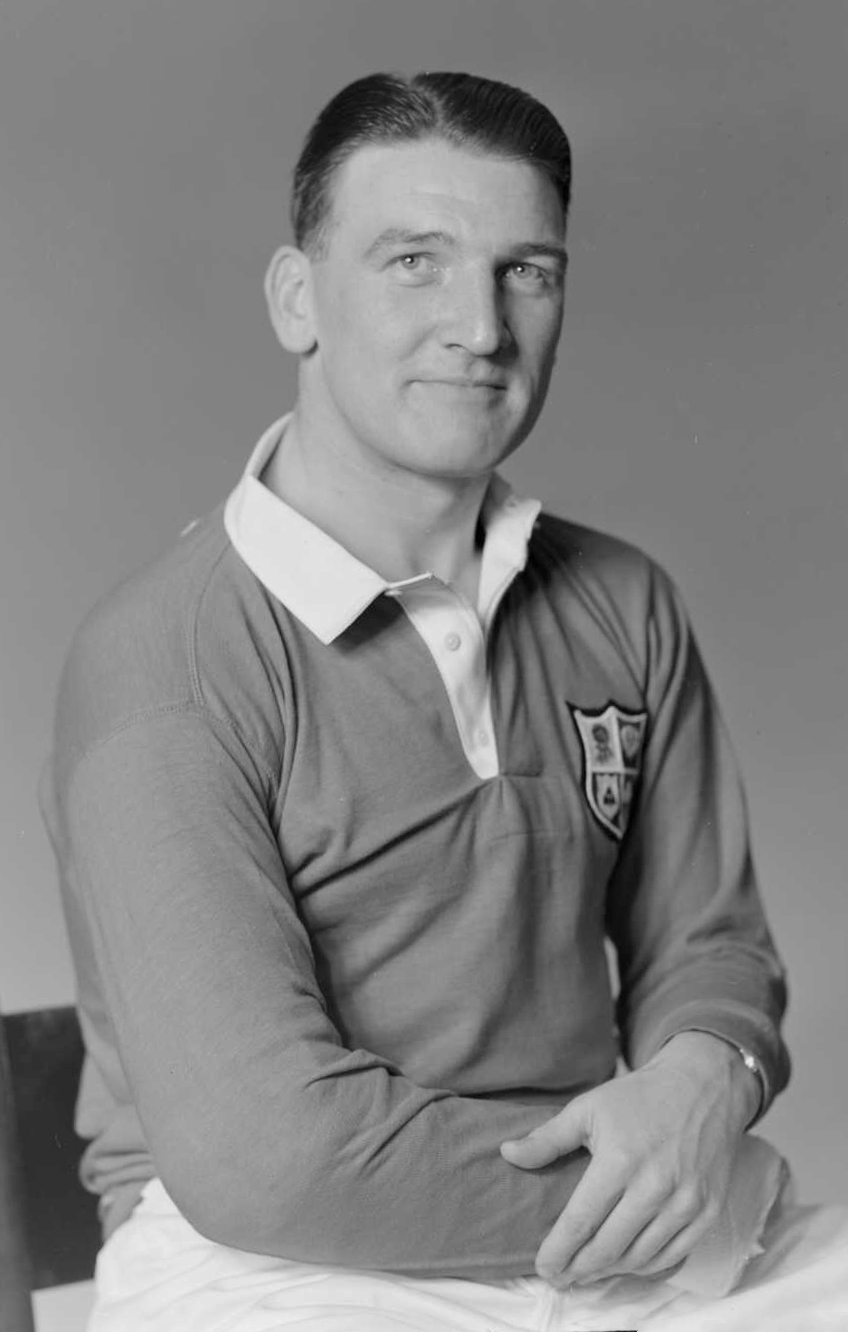
- Smith in New Zealand in 1950
- Born: Douglas William Cumming Smith; 27 October 1924 Aberdeen, Scotland
- Died: 22 September 1998 (aged 73) Midhurst, England
- Occupation: Doctor

Rugby union career
- Position: Wing
Amateur team(s)
Years	Team	Apps	(Points)
- Aberdeen University
–	London Scottish		
Provincial / State sides
Years	Team	Apps	(Points)
1947	North of Scotland District		
1950	Whites Trial		
International career
Years	Team	Apps	(Points)
1949–53	Scotland	8	(3)
1950	British and Irish Lions	1	(0)

100th President of the Scottish Rugby Union
- In office 1986–1987
- Preceded by: George Burrell
- Succeeded by: Bill Connon

Douglas William Cumming Smith OBE (27 October 1924 – 22 September 1998) was a Scotland international rugby union player. He played as a Wing.

== Rugby Union career ==
=== Amateur career ===
Smith played club rugby with Aberdeen University and London Scottish.

=== Provincial career ===
He played for North of Scotland District in their 1947 match against Midlands District.

He played on the left wing for the Whites Trial side in 1950.

=== International career ===
Smith was capped 8 times for Scotland, and was a member of the British Lions team that toured in 1950.

In 1946, while playing for the Aberdeen University club, Smith made an appearance for Scotland against a New Zealand Army touring team, in an uncapped match held to mark the end of the Second World War.

Smith made his capped début for the Scotland national team in January 1949, in a Five Nations Championship match against France. He went on to play in all four of Scotland's matches in that year's Championship. He played three matches in the 1950 Five Nations Championship.

He was included in the British Lions squad for their tour to New Zealand and Australia. A broken arm kept him out until the 18th game of the tour, but he recovered to play in four tour matches against local opposition and one of the test matches against the Australia national team.

The Barbarians invitational team included Smith in their squad for their 1949 Easter Tour, and he featured in two games for the team, against Penarth and Newport.

=== Administrative career ===
Smith was Team Manager for the 1971 British Lions tour to New Zealand. Following a loss in the initial tour game against Queensland, Queensland coach Des Connor proclaimed the 1971 team to be "undoubtedly the worst team in history to be sent to New Zealand.". Smith countered by predicting that the Lions would win two of their test matches against New Zealand, lose one and draw the other to win the series 2–1. They went on to do exactly that, and as of 2017 are the only Lions team to have recorded a series win against New Zealand.

Following his achievements with the Lions, he was awarded the OBE in the 1972 New Year Honours list.

He held the position of Scottish Rugby Union President for the 1986–87 season.
