= George Jack (rugby union) =

Scottish rugby union player

- Born: George W. Jack

Rugby union career
- Position: Hooker
Amateur team(s)
| Years | Team | Apps | (Points) |
- Leith
Provincial / State sides
| Years | Team | Apps | (Points) |
- Edinburgh District

120th President of the Scottish Rugby Union
- In office 2007–2008
- Preceded by: Andy Irvine
- Succeeded by: Jim Stevenson

George Jack is a Scottish former rugby union player. He was the 120th President of the Scottish Rugby Union; and the first President to be elected in a three-way vote.

== Rugby Union career ==
=== Amateur career ===
He played for Leith. He became club captain.

=== Provincial career ===
He was capped by Edinburgh District.

He was selected for Edinburgh District to play against Australia in their 1975 match at Myreside Stadium.

=== Administrative career ===
Jack became the 120th President of the Scottish Rugby Union. He served the standard one year from 2007 to 2008.

In the first ever three way vote for President, Jack secured 57 votes; and his rivals for the job - Peter Brown and Jim Stevenson - polled 56 votes each. This meant that for the second round of voting Brown and Stevenson - since tied - had to cut cards to determine who would go forward for the final ballot against Jack. Peter Brown decided to pull out of the vote to let Stevenson go forward without cutting cards. Jack won the second and final round by 91 votes to 75 votes.

During his presidency Jack defended the SRU's financial position. He stated that that would vigorously defend in court the claims of Edinburgh Rugby if needed. The Edinburgh side had claimed that they were owed a six figure sum from the Scottish Rugby Union.

Jack stated:

"As we have continually reminded the new Edinburgh owners, the agreements between the union and Edinburgh Rugby form a binding contract and we expect Edinburgh to honour its obligations. This means, for example, that we expect Edinburgh to release players for Scotland duty. If they choose not to do so we will defend the union’s position and as necessary protect our rights in the best interests of the game. Ultimately, this means that if Edinburgh decides to press its claims through the courts we will, albeit with a heavy heart, defend our position vigorously."

However set against this robust defence of the SRU finances was the closure - during Jack's presidency - of Scotland's third professional side: the Border Reivers. The closure cost was estimated at £1.76 million, though this was less than the annual budget to run the club.
