= Charlie Ritchie =

Scottish rugby union player (1933–2008)

- Born: Charlie Ritchie; 8 September 1933 Peterhead, Scotland
- Died: 29 September 2008 (aged 75) Aberdeen, Scotland

Rugby union career
- Position: Hooker
Amateur team(s)
Years	Team	Apps	(Points)
1951-70	Aberdeen GSFP		
Provincial / State sides
Years	Team	Apps	(Points)
1966	North and Midlands		
1966	North of Scotland District		

111th President of the Scottish Rugby Union
- In office 1997–1998
- Preceded by: Fred McLeod
- Succeeded by: Derek Brown

Charlie Ritchie (8 September 1933 – 29 September 2008) was a Scottish rugby union player. He became the 111th President of the Scottish Rugby Union.

== Rugby union career ==
=== Amateur career ===
He went to Ferry Hill Primary School and then Aberdeen Grammar School where he played rugby union at the school. He enjoyed studying languages at school; particularly German.

On leaving school Ritchie then played for Aberdeen GSFP. He made over 500 appearances for the club.

=== Provincial career ===
He was capped by North and Midlands.

He played for the combined North of Scotland District in their match against Australia in 1966.

=== Administrative career ===
He was secretary of Aberdeen GSFP for 12 years; then a selector for North of Scotland District for 11 years. He joined the SRU as the North of Scotland District representative.

He was the Scotland team manager of the tour to Australia in 1992; and then became a liaison manager for teams touring Scotland.

He became the 111th President of the Scottish Rugby Union. He served one year from 1996 to 1997.

He was notorious for fighting the corner of Aberdeen and the north-east of Scotland. He termed Scottish rugby full of a 'south and Edinburgh mafia'.

== Outside of rugby union ==
He did two years national service in Germany, and worked with the Intelligence Corps and became fluent in German.

He worked in insurance with Guardian Royal Exchange, specialising in car insurance.

On his retiral from insurance he ran the Colwyn Hotel in Aberdeen with his wife.

== Death ==
Ritchie died of cancer, having developed a large tumour at the start of 2008. He left his body to medical science so there was no funeral only a memorium.

== Tributes ==
Derek Younger, chairman of Aberdeen Grammar Rugby:

We're all very sad at the news. He was a real fighter for rugby in the north-east and he earned a huge amount of respect for all the work he put in. He will be sadly missed.

The Aberdeen Grammar rugby programme gave this tribute:

We can nowadays never hope to replace someone of his stature and all who now play or take part in rugby are due him a great debt of gratitude. His greatest legacy will be our success in building upon his lifetime's work to continue to grow and strengthen his beloved sport in Aberdeen, the North-east and beyond.

The Aberdeen side had a minute's silence in their next match against Jed-Forest for respect.
