= Frank Moffat =

Scottish rugby union player

- Born: Frank J. C. Moffat; 1894 Edinburgh, Scotland
- Died: 1978 (aged 83–84) Edinburgh, Scotland
- School: George Watson's College
- University: University of Edinburgh

Rugby union career
- Position: Wing
Amateur team(s)
Years	Team	Apps	(Points)
-	Watsonians		
Coaching career
- Years: Team
- -: Frank Moffat's XV
Refereeing career
Years	Competition		Apps
1931	Scottish Districts		
1932	Home Nations		1

66th President of the Scottish Rugby Union
- In office 1952–1953
- Preceded by: Dan Drysdale
- Succeeded by: Malcolm Allan

Lt. Col. Frank Moffat (1894-1978) was a Scottish rugby union player. He became an international referee and the 66th President of the Scottish Rugby Union. He had a distinguished military career with the Gordon Highlanders in the First World War.

== Rugby Union career ==
=== Amateur career ===
He played for Watsonians. He scored 47 tries in club rugby in the 1920–21 season.

=== Referee career ===
He refereed the Glasgow District versus South Africa match in 1931.

He was an international referee. He refereed the Wales versus England match in the 1932 Home Nations Championship.

=== Coaching career ===
He organised his own representative side, the Frank Moffat XV. His side would play Watsonians every year around New Year. He very often picked players from north-east Scotland in his team. His side accrued a lot of status and the Frank Moffat XV versus Watsonians match was almost treated as another trial match by the Scotland selectors.

=== Administrative career ===
During the Second World War Moffat was the convenor of the Scottish Command Rugby Football Committee.

He was a member of the SRU selection committee for many years.

He was Vice-President of the SRU in 1951.

He was President of the Scottish Rugby Union for the period 1952 to 1953.

== Military career ==
He was a Lieutenant Colonel of the Gordon Highlanders and a member of the Royal Company of Archers.

Moffat won the Distinguished Service Order in 1917 for his service with the 8/10th battalion in the Battle of Ypres.

The citation reads:

For conspicuous gallantry and devotion to duty in an attack. He was in command of the right attacking company, which was opposed to a powerful system of the enemy’s defences. He led his company forward with the greatest courage and determination under heavy fire, but they were eventually held up by a machine-gun firing from a concrete emplacement. This he attacked single-handed, putting all the team out of action. He was badly wounded during this encounter, but, inspiring his men to further efforts, he led them several hundred yards further before he fell exhausted. His splendid courage and determination were undoubtedly responsible for the success of the attack.

The Gordon Highlanders Museum in Aberdeen features the 'Moffat Trench' - a replica First World War trench - which is named after him.

As an archer Moffat won the Montrose Silver Arrow competition twice; in 1954 and in 1959 after a play-off.

== Outside of rugby union and military ==
He studied medicine at Edinburgh University but as war broke in 1914 he joined the Gordon Highlanders and never returned to medicine.

He played cricket for Watsonians.

He was a mining engineer by trade. In 1947 he was appointed Estates Mining Engineer for the Scottish division of the National Coal Board.

He died in hospital in 1978 after a stroke. His death was at the end of March that year.
