= Craig Stanley =

Craig Stanley may refer to:

- Craig Stanley (footballer) (born 1983), English footballer
- Craig Stanley (cricketer) (born 1971), former English cricketer
- Craig A. Stanley (born 1955), American Democratic Party politician in the New Jersey General Assembly
- Craig Stanley (Home and Away), fictional character on Australian soap opera Home and Away
