= Rae Tod =

Scottish rugby union player

- Born: Ross Tod; 8 December 1913 Edinburgh, Scotland
- Died: 3 August 1995 (aged 81) Edinburgh, Scotland
- School: Edinburgh Academy

Rugby union career
Amateur team(s)
Years	Team	Apps	(Points)
- Edinburgh Academicals

81st President of the Scottish Rugby Union
- In office 1967–1968
- Preceded by: Mark Stewart
- Succeeded by: Bill Nicholson

Rae Tod (8 December 1913 - 3 August 1995) was a Scottish rugby union player. He was the 81st President of the Scottish Rugby Union.

== Rugby Union career ==
=== Amateur career ===
He played for Edinburgh Academicals.

=== Administrative career ===
He became President of the Edinburgh Academical rugby club.

He joined the SRU committee in 1956.

He became the 81st President of the Scottish Rugby Union. He served the standard one year from 1967 to 1968.

== Cricket career ==
He played cricket for Edinburgh Academicals.

He would later become the President of the Edinburgh Academical cricket club.

== Military career ==
Tod was in the Royal Scots. During the Second World War he fought in North Africa and Italy. He achieved the rank of Major and on coming home to Scotland he led the victory parade along Princes Street in Edinburgh.

== Business career ==
He joined the stockbroking firm of John Robertson and worked his way to senior partner.

The firm amalgamated with Bell Cowan and Co.

He was a Chairman of the Edinburgh Stock Exchange from 1968 to 1970.

He was a Chairman of the Scottish Stock Exchange from 1972 to 1973.

In 1974 he was part of the Edinburgh branch of Parsons & Company. That was consumed by the larger Glasgow company which became Allied Provincial Parsons Penney. He retired from there in 1987.

== Other interests ==
Tod was a keen golfer and squash player.

== Family ==
Tod was the youngest son of Ross Tod, formerly of 8 Learmouth Place, Edinburgh.

His brother, Ben Ross Tod, played cricket for Scotland. He played rugby for the Barbarians. He also played for Edinburgh Academicals and represented Edinburgh District and played in trial matches for Scotland selection. He captained the Edinburgh Academical cricket club. He married Jean Aitken who played lacrosse for Edinburgh Satelittes.

His sister, Barra Tod, was a Scottish international tennis player.

His wife, Muriel Shank Menzies, died on 9 June 1995; they were survived by four children. Muriel's father was George Macbeth Menzies, chairman of the North British Steel foundry in Bathgate.
