= Jimmie Ireland =

Scotland international rugby union player & referee

- Born: James Cecil Hardin Ireland; 10 December 1903 Glasgow, Scotland
- Died: 25 October 1998 (aged 94) Polmont, Scotland

Rugby union career
- Position: Hooker
Amateur team(s)
Years	Team	Apps	(Points)
- Glasgow HSFP
Provincial / State sides
Years	Team	Apps	(Points)
1924	Glasgow District		
International career
Years	Team	Apps	(Points)
- Scotland U16
1925-27	Scotland	11	(0)
1936	Barbarians		
Refereeing career
Years	Competition		Apps
1938-39	Home Nations		5

64th President of the Scottish Rugby Union
- In office 1950–1951
- Preceded by: Hamish Shaw
- Succeeded by: Dan Drysdale

Jimmie Ireland (10 December 1903 - 25 October 1998) was a Scotland international rugby union player. He became the 64th President of the Scottish Rugby Union.

== Rugby Union career ==
=== Amateur career ===
Ireland was born in Sauchiehall Street and went to Garnethill Primary. He then attended Glasgow High School.

He played for Glasgow HSFP.

The Jimmie Ireland stand at the Glasgow club was opened in 2000.

=== Provincial career ===
He played for Glasgow District in the 1924 inter-city match.

=== International career ===
He was capped at the age of 14 for Scotland Schools.

He received ten caps for Scotland from 1925 to 1927.

He was the last surviving member of Scotland's first Grand Slam side of 1925. In 1996, he opened a block of hospitality suites at Murrayfield Stadium each one bearing a name of that famous XV.

He swapped jerseys with Sam Tucker, the England hooker, after Scotland had beaten England at Twickenham in 1926. He was given a bill by the SRU for the loss of the Scotland jersey of 12 shillings and 6 pence.

=== Referee career ===
He was an international referee. He refereed 5 Home Nations Championship matches between 1938 and 1939.

=== Administrative career ===
He became President of Glasgow HSFP.

He was a Chairman of the International Rugby Board. As Chairman, in 1949, he saw that Australia, South Africa and New Zealand were admitted as full members for the first time.

He was President of the Scottish Rugby Union for the period 1950 to 1951.

== Outside of rugby ==
Ireland was an accountant. An anecdote he often told at rugby dinners was the time he asked his boss for Saturday morning off as he was playing for Scotland at Murrayfield. His boss replied: 'What? The whole morning?'.
