= Dan Drysdale =

British Lions & Scotland international rugby union player

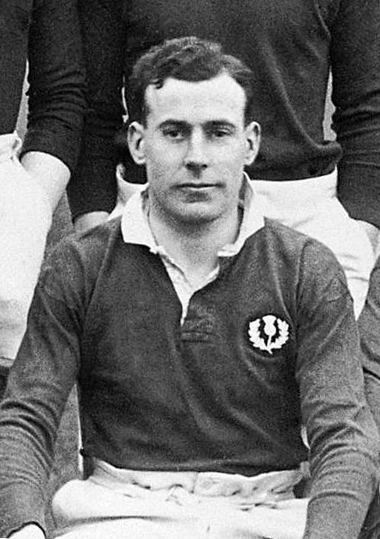
- Born: Daniel Drysdale; 18 May 1901 Kippen, Scotland
- Died: 15 October 1987 (aged 86) Yeovil, England

Rugby union career
- Position: Full Back
Amateur team(s)
Years	Team	Apps	(Points)
- Heriots
–	Edinburgh University		
–	Oxford University		
–	London Scottish		
Provincial / State sides
Years	Team	Apps	(Points)
1923	Edinburgh District		
International career
Years	Team	Apps	(Points)
1923–29	Scotland	26	(45)
1924	British and Irish Lions	4	(0)
–	Barbarians		

65th President of the Scottish Rugby Union
- In office 1951–1952
- Preceded by: Jimmie Ireland
- Succeeded by: Frank Moffat

Daniel Drysdale (18 May 1901 – 15 October 1987) was a Scotland international rugby union player. He was the 65th president of the Scottish Rugby Union.

== Rugby union career ==
=== Amateur career ===
Born in Kippen, Stirlingshire Drysdale, went to George Heriots and also played for Heriot's FP, and London Scottish. He went to Edinburgh University and the University of Oxford, where he played for the teams Edinburgh University RFC and Oxford University RFC.

=== Provincial career ===
He played for Edinburgh District in the 1923 inter-city match.

=== International career ===
Drysdale played for Scotland and the Lions.

He was on the 1924 British Lions tour to South Africa.

He also played for the Barbarians.

=== Administrative career ===
Drysdale was president of the Scottish Rugby Union between 1951 and 1952.

== Outside of rugby union ==
Drysdale was a timber merchant.

== Sources ==
- Bath, Richard (ed.) The Scotland Rugby Miscellany (Vision Sports Publishing Ltd, 2007 ISBN 1-905326-24-6)
- Godwin, Terry Complete Who's Who of International Rugby (Cassell, 1987, ISBN 0-7137-1838-2)
- Massie, Allan A Portrait of Scottish Rugby (Polygon, Edinburgh; ISBN 0-904919-84-6)
