= Ben Tod =

Scottish cricketer

Personal information
- Full name: Ben Ross Tod
- Born: 6 August 1908; Edinburgh, Midlothian, Scotland
- Died: 3 June 1967 (aged 58); Belmont, Surrey, England
- Batting: Right-handed
- Bowling: Right-arm off break

Domestic team information
- Years: Team
- 1930–1939: Scotland

Career statistics
Competition	First-class
Matches	11
Runs scored	387
Batting average	22.76
100s/50s	1/–
Top score	143*
Balls bowled	36
Wickets	1
Bowling average	23.00
5 wickets in innings	–
10 wickets in match	–
Best bowling	1/17
Catches/stumpings	5/–
- Source: Cricinfo, 26 July 2022

Ben Ross Tod (6 August 1908 – 3 June 1967) was a Scottish first-class cricketer and rugby player.

The son of Ross Tod, he was born at Stockbridge in Edinburgh in August 1908. He was educated in the city at the Edinburgh Academy. A club cricketer for Edinburgh Academical Cricket Club, he made his debut for Scotland against the touring Australians at Edinburgh in 1930. He played first-class cricket for Scotland until 1939, making eleven appearances; six of these were against Ireland, with four played against various touring teams, and one against English county side Yorkshire. Playing in the Scottish side as a batsman, he scored 387 runs at an average of 22.76; he passed fifty once, scoring 143 not out against Ireland in 1936. Having come to crease with Scotland at 58 for 5, Tod shared in a partnership of 190 for the sixth wicket with Alastair McTavish. In his final first-class match in 1939, he captained the side against Ireland.

Outside of cricket, he was a noted rugby player who played for Edinburgh Academical Football Club and the Barbarians, and was a member of the 1929–30 Scottish Unofficial Championship winning side. Tod served in the British Army during the Second World War, being commissioned as a second lieutenant in the Royal Artillery shortly before the outbreak of the war. Following the war, Tod was promoted to major in the Territorial Army in May 1947. He was decorated with the Territorial Army Efficiency Decoration in April 1950. Tod died in June 1967 in England at Belmont, Surrey. His brother, Rae Tod, was also a rugby player and was president of the Scottish Rugby Union.
