= Bill Nicholson (cricketer) =

Scottish cricketer and Scottish Rugby Union president

- Born: William Nicholson; 7 May 1909 Kirn, Argyll, Scotland
- Died: 10 April 2001 (aged 91) Rhu, Argyll and Bute, Scotland

Rugby union career
Amateur team(s)
| Years | Team | Apps | (Points) |
- West of Scotland
Provincial / State sides
| Years | Team | Apps | (Points) |
- Glasgow District

82nd President of the Scottish Rugby Union
- In office 1968–1969
- Preceded by: Rae Tod
- Succeeded by: George Crerar
- Cricket career

Cricket information
- Batting: Right-handed

International information
- National side: Scotland

Domestic team information
- Years: Team
- 1929-33: Scotland

Career statistics
| Competition | First-class |
|---|---|
| Matches | 10 |
| Runs scored | 396 |
| Batting average | 24.75 |
| 100s/50s | 1/1 |
| Top score | 101 |
| Balls bowled |
| Wickets |
| Bowling average |
| 5 wickets in innings |
| 10 wickets in match |
| Best bowling |
| Catches/stumpings | 6/0 |
- Source: Cricinfo, 23 March 2018

Bill Nicholson (7 May 1909 – 10 April 2001) was a Scotland international cricketer. He also played rugby union and he became president of the Scottish Rugby Union in 1968-69.

== Cricket career ==
In 1929, Nicholson scored a century on his debut for Scotland against Ireland in Dublin at the age of 20.

== Rugby Union career ==
=== Amateur career ===
Nicholson played rugby for West of Scotland.

=== Provincial career ===
He was capped for Glasgow District and had a trial for the Scotland national rugby union team but was not selected.

=== Administrative career ===
With West of Scotland he was president from 1958 to 1976, coinciding with one of the club's most successful periods.

He served as president of the Scottish Rugby Union in 1968-69.
