= Bob Hogg (rugby union) =

- Born: Robert J. Hogg

Rugby union career
- Position: Forward
Amateur team(s)
Years	Team	Apps	(Points)
- Gala

71st President of the Scottish Rugby Union
- In office 1957–1958
- Preceded by: Max Simmers
- Succeeded by: David MacMyn

Bob Hogg was a Scottish rugby union player. He was the 71st President of the Scottish Rugby Union.

== Rugby Union career ==
=== Amateur career ===
He played for Gala and captained the First XV in 1936.

=== Administrative career ===
He was elected on the Gala committee in 1929 and was honorary treasurer of Gala in 1935.

Hogg was involved with the Border League as secretary; and also held the post of secretary of the South District Union. He was described as the most 'acute of these [secretaries], wearing his two hats with vast aplomb from 1928 to 1949.'

The book Rummle them up! The Border Rugby Story explains the difficulties of holding the Border League and District Union post at the same time:

[The secretary] could never allow his left hand to know what his right hand was doing. League and Union representatives would meet in the same place on the same night, in a quorum composed of much the same people, but the secretary kept two minute books, one for Union eyes, the other strictly for home consumption in the League.

At a Gala rugby dinner as SRU representative, Hogg responded to a question about the press picking the Scotland international team instead of the SRU selection committee. His response was scathing of the press:

It would be a revelation to see the team chosen by experts of the Press, especially if the responsibility was on their shoulders. It must be apparent to the public that the sensational titbits which appeared about rugby football, were, with a few exceptions. only a prostitution of the game. They wrote their puerile nonsense about the game for personal gain, and a friend of his had ranked them as second rate prostitutes. Personally, he only disagreed with that in a matter of degree; he would say they were third rate!

Hogg was elected vice-president of the SRU in 1956.

He became the 71st president of the Scottish Rugby Union. He served the standard one year from 1957 to 1958.

== Outside of rugby union ==
Hogg was made the chairman of the committee for the Galashiels festival, the Braw Lads Gathering, in 1939.
