= International cricket in 1939 =

International cricket season

The 1939 International cricket season ran from April 1939 to August 1939.

== Season overview ==
International tours
Start date	Home team	Away team	Results [Matches]			
Start date	Home team	Away team	Test	ODI	FC	LA
24 June 1939	England	West Indies	1–0 [3]	—	—	—
24 June 1939	Ireland	Scotland	—	—	0–1 [1]	—
14 August 1939	England	Netherlands	—	—	1–0 [1]	—

== June ==
=== West Indies in England ===
Test series
No.	Date	Home captain	Away captain	Venue	Result
Test 272	24–27 June	Wally Hammond	Rolph Grant	Lord's, London	England by 8 wickets
Test 273	22–25 July	Wally Hammond	Rolph Grant	Old Trafford Cricket Ground, Manchester	Match drawn
Test 274	19–22 August	Wally Hammond	Rolph Grant	Kennington Oval, London	Match drawn

=== Scotland in Ireland ===
Three-day Match
No.	Date	Home captain	Away captain	Venue	Result
Match	24–27 June	Ben Tod	James MacDonald	College Park, Dublin	Scotland by 162 runs

== August ==
=== Netherlands in England ===
Two-day Match
No.	Date	Home captain	Away captain	Venue	Result
Match	14–15 August	Percy Chapman	Not mentioned	Lord's, London	Marylebone by an innings and 56 runs
