= Jimmy Ross (rugby union) =

Scottish rugby union player and referee

- Born: James Ross
- Died: 22 December 1997
- School: George Heriot's School

Rugby union career
- Position: Prop
Amateur team(s)
Years	Team	Apps	(Points)
- Heriots
Refereeing career
Years	Competition		Apps
1954	Kelso Sevens		

93rd President of the Scottish Rugby Union
- In office 1979–1980
- Preceded by: Lex Govan
- Succeeded by: Cliff Wilton

Jimmy Ross was a Scottish rugby union player. He was the 93rd President of the Scottish Rugby Union.

== Rugby Union career ==
=== Amateur career ===
He went to George Heriot's School and was captain of the school in 1940.

He played for Heriots.

=== Referee career ===
He refereed in the 1954 Kelso Sevens.

=== Administrative career ===
He was a president of Heriots.

He was vice-president of the SRU in 1978.

Ross became the 93rd President of the Scottish Rugby Union. He served the standard one year from 1979 to 1980.

== Death ==
Ross died on 22 December 1997. The Glasgow Herald told of the time when Ross - with a SRU party of dignities - was with their sports journalist travelling to watch Scotland play France. The party was directed by the French police the wrong way up a one-way street to speed their progress to the Parc des Princes. The journalist recalled Ross's quip: 'If they had got their army to the Front this quickly, the course of history might have been changed'. The obituary noted that Ross was a journalist's delight: a man with an opinion on everything; and his best stories were told against himself.

He was cremated on 29 December 1997.
