= Robert Scott (rugby union, born 1882) =

Scottish rugby union player & referee

- Born: Robert Lunn Scott; 12 February 1882 Hawick, Scotland
- Died: 21 December 1950 (aged 68) Edinburgh, Scotland

Rugby union career
- Position: Centre
Amateur team(s)
Years	Team	Apps	(Points)
-	Hawick Trinity		
–	Hawick		
Provincial / State sides
Years	Team	Apps	(Points)
1910	Roxburghshire		
1910	South of Scotland District		
Refereeing career
Years	Competition		Apps
1926-29	Scottish Districts		
1927	Five Nations Championship		2
1928	Gala Sevens		

61st President of the Scottish Rugby Union
- In office 1947–1948
- Preceded by: Harry Smith
- Succeeded by: James Moir Mackenzie

Robert Scott (12 February 1882 – 21 December 1950) was a Scottish rugby union player. He became an international referee and later the 61st President of the Scottish Rugby Union.

== Rugby Union career ==
=== Amateur career ===
Scott played for Hawick Trinity in 1904.

In 1910 he was playing for Hawick.

=== Provincial career ===
He represented Roxburghshire in their game against Selkirkshire on 29 January 1910.

He represented the South of Scotland District in their game against the Eastern League in Edinburgh, 26 February 1910.

=== Referee career ===
He refereed the 1926 Scotland Probables versus Scotland Possibles match.

He refereed two international matches in 1927, both in the Five Nations Championship. The first was the France versus Ireland match; the next was the England versus Wales match.

He was one of the referees that refereed in the 1928 Gala Sevens.

He refereed the 1929 Inter-City match.

=== Administrative career ===
He became Secretary and Treasurer of the Border League in 1912.

He was Honorary Treasurer of Hawick in 1912 and 1919.

He was the Honorary Secretary of Hawick in 1928.

As part of the SRU, in 1931 he presided over the South of Scotland District union meeting in Melrose.

He was President of the Scottish Rugby Union for the period 1947 to 1948. Elected on 20 May 1947, it was stated that Scott would retire from his post at the bank later that month.

Bill McLaren in his autobiography tells of this story of his playing days at Hawick. While playing for Hawick at the weekend he put his hands on his opponents shoulders before putting him to the floor. A few days later he walking past the bank in Hawick and he heard a tap on the window. It was Robert Scott, the President of the SRU and also the bank's manager, and he beckoned McLaren inside. He was marched past the tellers and into the manager's office whereupon Scott gave him a telling off. 'Billy. Dinnae do it. Tackle by the legs.'

After being President of SRU, he was the President of Hawick from 1948 to 1950.

== Outside of rugby union ==
He played cricket for Hawick and Wilton cricket club. The cricket club presented him with a smoker's cabinet to celebrate his wedding in 1910. It was stated during the speeches that Scott had great promise as a fielder.

During the First World War, Scott was elected onto the committee of the Municipal War Savings Association in Hawick.

Scott had a career in banking and was eventually promoted to Bank Manager of the Hawick branch of the National Bank of Scotland.

In 1910 Scott was a teller in the bank. They had presented him with a marble clock, side ornaments, and a silver cigarette case and silver match box on his wedding.

His banking career was on the rise in 1923 when he was promoted to assistant agent.

He became a senior agent for the National Bank of Scotland in November 1936.

He was also a Justice of the Peace.

== Death ==
He died on the 21 December 1950, His funeral in Hawick was one of the biggest the town had seen; with the SRU, border rugby clubs and city clubs and the Hawick and Wilton cricket club all represented.

He is buried in Wellogate Cemetery in Hawick.
