= Fred McLeod =

Fred McLeod may refer to:

- Fred McLeod (golfer)
- Fred McLeod (sportscaster)
- Fred McLeod (rugby union)
