= Charlie Drummond =

Charlie Drummond may refer to:

- Charlie Drummond (rugby union) (1920–1985), Scotland international rugby union player
- Charlie Drummond (River City), a character from the BBC soap River City
- Charlie Drummond (Big Brother), a contestant on the 2009 series of the UK version of Big Brother
