= Robert Greig (rugby union) =

Scotland international rugby union player

- Born: Robert Coventry Greig; 30 May 1871 Glasgow, Scotland
- Died: 10 January 1951 (aged 79)

Rugby union career
- Position: Half back
Amateur team(s)
Years	Team	Apps	(Points)
1889	Glasgow Academicals		
Provincial / State sides
Years	Team	Apps	(Points)
1892	Glasgow District		
1893	West of Scotland District		
1893	Cities District		
International career
Years	Team	Apps	(Points)
1893-97	Scotland	2	(0)

30th President of the Scottish Rugby Union
- In office 1903–1904
- Preceded by: Roger Davidson
- Succeeded by: John Simpson

Robert Greig (30 May 1871 – 10 January 1951) was a Scotland international rugby union player.

== Life ==
Greig was born in 1871. His elder sister was Agnes Ethel Greig. She died in 1902 and it was only later that he discovered that he had three nieces, Agnes, Elspeth and Ethel Robertson, after his late sister's son contacted him. His nieces would go on to control a large whisky business.

== Rugby union career ==
=== Amateur career ===
Greig played with Glasgow Academicals. He was playing with the club from 1889. The club had a Spring Meeting festival day in 1891. As part of that, there was a drop kick tournament to see how far the contenders could drop kick a goal. Greig won the tournament by drop kicking from 61 yards out, though it was aided by the wind.

=== Provincial career ===
Greig played for Glasgow District against Edinburgh District in the 1892 inter-city match.

He also played for the West of Scotland District in their match against East of Scotland District on 21 January 1893.

He played for Cities District against Provinces District on 23 December 1893.

=== International career ===
Greig was capped twice for Scotland between 1893 and 1897.

=== Administrative career ===
He became the 30th President of the Scottish Rugby Union. He served one year from 1903 to 1904.

== Cricket career ==
He was playing for the Glasgow Academical Cricket Club in 1891.
