= Iain Todd =

Scottish rugby union player

- Born: Iain M. Todd; 10 October 1924 Glasgow, Scotland
- Died: 2 August 2017 (aged 92) Bearsden, Scotland
- School: Hillhead High School
- University: University of Glasgow

Rugby union career
Amateur team(s)
Years	Team	Apps	(Points)
- Glasgow University
1947-	Hillhead HSFP		
International career
Years	Team	Apps	(Points)
1948	Myanmar XV		

109th President of the Scottish Rugby Union
- In office 1995–1996
- Preceded by: Ken Smith
- Succeeded by: Fred McLeod

Iain Todd (1924–2017) was a Scottish rugby union player. He was the 109th President of the Scottish Rugby Union.

== Rugby Union career ==
=== Amateur career ===
Born in Clouston Street, Glasgow, Todd went to Hillhead High School with his brother, David Todd. He played rugby for the school. On leaving school Todd went to the University of Glasgow to study medicine.

While he was at Glasgow University he played for Glasgow University rugby union side.

After leaving the university, Todd then played for Hillhead HSFP.

=== International career ===
While in Burma - now Myanmar - with the Royal Army Medical Corps he played for a Burma XV against the British Army.

=== Referee career ===
He became Hillhead RFC 1st XV's touch judge. He often packed his Hillhead strip in his linesman kit bag - unbeknownst to his wife - in case the 'team was ever short'.

=== Administrative career ===
He served on the Glasgow District committee from the mid-1970s.

He was elected to the SRU general committee in 1980.

Todd became the 109th President of the Scottish Rugby Union. He served the standard one year from 1995 to 1996.

== Military career ==
Todd left Hillhead High School in 1942. He joined the Home Guard for the rest of the Second World War while studying at university. He then joined the Royal Army Medical Corps in 1948 and went to Myanmar as part of the Burma mission.

== Medical career ==
He went to Glasgow University to study medicine in 1942. After returning from Myanmar he completed his residency at the Western Infirmary. He joined a General Practice in Govan with the former swimmer Dr Mirrlees Chassels.

== Other interests ==
His grandfather had a farm in Campeltown, Kintyre and he developed a love of Argyll.

He joined the Loch Lomond Sailing Club, which is closer to Glasgow than to Campeltown. He became a long-time member and knew the loch intimately.

== Tributes ==
John Beattie recalled a time when Todd helped him through an injury:

It was my career-ending ligament injury. Iain’s daughter lived round the corner from our top-floor flat in Broomhill and Iain was very generous in wanting to help. I had a pin through my knee and kept yelping as he pushed me up the stairs grunting: ‘Just a few more steps…’ he was a truly lovely man and a huge part of my early life. Old fashioned and honest.

Alan Hosie, former international referee and one time SRU President:

Iain was immensely popular within rugby, and never more so than when he was international tickets allocation secretary and convener; then, he was everybody’s friend!
