= Lex Govan =

Scottish rugby union player

- Born: Alexander Darling Govan; 1914 Edinburgh, Scotland
- Died: 1996 (aged 81–82)
- School: Daniel Stewart's College

Rugby union career
- Position: Hooker
Amateur team(s)
Years	Team	Apps	(Points)
1933-48	Stewart's College FP		
Provincial / State sides
Years	Team	Apps	(Points)
1935	Scotland Probables		
-	Edinburgh District		

92nd President of the Scottish Rugby Union
- In office 1978–1979
- Preceded by: Frank Coutts
- Succeeded by: Jimmy Ross

Lex Govan (1914 – July 1996) was a Scottish rugby union player. He was the 92nd President of the Scottish Rugby Union.

== Rugby Union career ==
=== Amateur career ===
He played rugby union and cricket for Daniel Stewart's College. On leaving school he played for Stewart's College FP, playing in the 1st XV at the age of 17. He was one of the side that won the 1937-38 Scottish Unofficial Championship; the first championship title in the club's history.

During the Second World War he joined the Royal Scots but he was back at Stewart's College FP in 1946 and the club won another championship title.

=== Provincial career ===
Govan played for the Scotland Probables in the 1934-35 season. He was never selected for Scotland; the closest he came was being the reserve hooker in the 1946-47 season.

He was capped for Edinburgh District and captained the side.

=== Administrative career ===
He served on the Stewart's College FP committee and was President of the club 1956 to 1958.

He was on the selection committee of Edinburgh District from 1958 to 1961. He was elected to the SRU as a District representative in 1961.

Govan was on the SRU selection committee from 1962 to 1973. He was also a British and Irish Lions selector.

He was Vice-President of the SRU in 1977.

Govan became the 92nd President of the Scottish Rugby Union. He served the standard one year from 1978 to 1979.

== Military career ==
During the Second World War, Govan joined the Royal Scots.
