= Charlie Drummond (rugby union) =

Scotland international rugby union player

- Born: Charles William Drummond; 26 May 1920 St Boswells, Scotland
- Died: 9 May 1985 (aged 64) Ardgay, Sutherland, Scotland

Rugby union career
- Position: Centre
Amateur team(s)
Years	Team	Apps	(Points)
- Melrose
Provincial / State sides
Years	Team	Apps	(Points)
1947	South of Scotland District		
International career
Years	Team	Apps	(Points)
1947-50	Scotland	11	(3)

88th President of the Scottish Rugby Union
- In office 1974–1975
- Preceded by: Donny Innes
- Succeeded by: John Henry Orr

Charlie Drummond (26 May 1920 – 9 May 1985) was a Scotland international rugby union player. He became the 88th President of the Scottish Rugby Union.

== Rugby Union career ==
=== Amateur career ===
Drummond played for Melrose.

=== Provincial career ===
He played for South of Scotland District in their match against Australia on 11 October 1947.

=== International career ===
He played for Scotland 11 times from 1947 to 1950.

=== Administrative career ===
He became the 88th President of the Scottish Rugby Union. He served the standard one year from 1974 to 1975.
