= Max Simmers =

Scotland international rugby union player

- Born: William Maxwell Simmers; 7 August 1904 Glasgow, Scotland
- Died: 14 November 1972 (aged 68) Helensburgh, Scotland

Rugby union career
- Position: Centre/Wing
Amateur team(s)
Years	Team	Apps	(Points)
- Glasgow Academicals
Provincial / State sides
Years	Team	Apps	(Points)
- Glasgow District
- Scotland Probables
International career
Years	Team	Apps	(Points)
1926–32	Scotland	28	(18)

70th President of the Scottish Rugby Union
- In office 1956–1957
- Preceded by: Robert Meldrum
- Succeeded by: Bob Hogg

William Maxwell Simmers (7 August 1904 in Glasgow – 14 November 1972 in Helensburgh) was a Scottish rugby union player. He was often referred to as "Max" and/or "Bill". He was the 70th President of the Scottish Rugby Union.

== Rugby Union career ==
=== Amateur career ===
He played for Glasgow Academicals.

=== Provincial career ===
He was capped for Glasgow District.

He played for Scotland Probables on 19 December 1931.

=== International career ===
He was capped twenty eight times between 1926 and 1932 for Scotland, scoring six tries.

=== Administrative career ===
He became the 70th President of the Scottish Rugby Union. He served one year from 1956 to 1957.

== Family ==
He was the father of Brian Simmers, who was also capped for Scotland.

He married the English tennis player Gwen Sterry on 9 July 1932 at St Mark's Church, Surbiton.
