= Harry Smith (rugby union) =

Scotland international rugby union player (1873–1957)

- Born: Harry Oswald Smith; 1 July 1873 North Berwick, East Lothian, Scotland
- Died: 31 July 1957 (aged 84) Tonbridge, England

Rugby union career
- Position: Forward
Amateur team(s)
Years	Team	Apps	(Points)
- Watsonians
Provincial / State sides
Years	Team	Apps	(Points)
- Edinburgh District
International career
Years	Team	Apps	(Points)
1895-1902	Scotland	11	(3)

60th President of the Scottish Rugby Union
- In office 1942–1947
- Preceded by: Patrick Munro
- Succeeded by: Robert Scott

Harry Oswald Smith (1 July 1873 – 31 July 1957) was a Scotland international rugby union player

== Rugby Union career ==
=== Amateur career ===
Smith played for Watsonians.

=== Provincial career ===
Smith was capped by Edinburgh District in 1898.

=== International career ===
Smith was capped 11 times for the Scotland international side.

=== Administrative career ===
Smith was President of the Scottish Rugby Union for the period 1942 to 1947.
