= Graham Birkett =

Scotland international rugby union player

- Born: Graham Anthony Birkett; 2 October 1954 (age 72) Dumbarton, Scotland

Rugby union career
- Position: Centre
Amateur team(s)
Years	Team	Apps	(Points)
-	Harlequins		
–	London Scottish		
Provincial / State sides
Years	Team	Apps	(Points)
1975-	Anglo-Scots		
1976-	Middlesex		
International career
Years	Team	Apps	(Points)
1975	Scotland	1	(0)

Graham Birkett is a former Scotland international rugby union player.

== Rugby Union career ==
=== Amateur career ===
He played for Harlequins.

He then played for London Scottish.

=== Provincial career ===
He played for Anglo-Scots.

He played for Middlesex in England.

=== International career ===
He received one cap for Scotland in 1975. This was on Scotland's tour of New Zealand in 1975 and Birkett played against the All Blacks.
