= Ken Smith (rugby union) =

Scottish rugby union player (1929–2026)

- Born: George Kenneth Smith; 2 June 1929 Edinburgh, Scotland
- Died: 26 February 2026 (aged 96)
- School: George Watson's College

Rugby union career
- Position: Flanker
Amateur team(s)
Years	Team	Apps	(Points)
- Watsonians
- Kelso
Provincial / State sides
Years	Team	Apps	(Points)
1956–1957	South of Scotland District		
International career
Years	Team	Apps	(Points)
1957–1961	Scotland	18	(0)
1959	British and Irish Lions	4	(3)

108th President of the Scottish Rugby Union
- In office 1994–1995
- Preceded by: Jock Steven
- Succeeded by: Iain Todd

George Kenneth Smith CBE (2 June 1929 – 26 February 2026) was a Scottish international rugby player. He played at flanker. He became the 108th President of the Scottish Rugby Union.

== Rugby union career ==
=== Amateur career ===
Smith was educated at George Watson's College and played club rugby for both Watsonians and Kelso.

=== Provincial career ===
Smith played for South of Scotland District in the 1956–57 Scottish Inter-District Championship and 1957–58 Scottish Inter-District Championship.

=== International career ===
Smith was capped eighteen times for Scotland between 1957 and 1961.

He also took part in the 1959 British Lions tour to Australia and New Zealand, playing in four tests, two against Australia and two against New Zealand.

=== Administrative career ===
Smith moved into the Scottish Rugby Union (SRU) administration after being Tour Manager for Scotland's tour to New Zealand in 1981. He was both Chairman of the IRB (now World Rugby) and President of the SRU.

While President of the SRU, in 1995, he was appointed a CBE for his contribution to the sport of rugby.

== Death ==
Smith died from pneumonia on 26 February 2026, at the age of 96. At the time of his death, he was also suffering from vascular dementia.
