= Ian Barr =

129th President of the Scottish Rugby Union

- Born: Ian Barr c. 1963 (age 62–63) Bonnyrigg, Scotland

Rugby union career
Amateur team(s)
Years	Team	Apps	(Points)
-	Lasswade		
-	West of Scotland		
-	Stirling County		
-	Edinburgh Academicals		
-	Police Scotland		
-	Selkirk		
-	Musselburgh		
-	Lasswade		

129th President of the Scottish Rugby Union
- In office 2020–2022
- Preceded by: Dee Bradbury
- Succeeded by: Colin Rigby

Ian Barr is a Scottish former rugby union player. He was the 129th president of the Scottish Rugby Union (SRU); the 128th person to hold the office.

== Rugby union career ==
=== Amateur career ===
Barr had a number of clubs:- Esk Valley Banthams, Lasswade. West of Scotland, Stirling County, Edinburgh Academicals, Police Scotland, Selkirk, Musselburgh and Lasswade again. While at Musselburgh he suffered an injury which impacted his playing career, which made Barr finish his career at Lasswade. He also played for the East of Scotland College of Agriculture and Oatridge College.

=== Administrative career ===
He became a president of Lasswade and held that position for 15 years.

He was elected onto the SRU council in 2012. He had two years on the SRU board from 2017. He was an Ambassador for the Scotland U20 from 2013 to 2017.

He was voted a vice-president of the SRU in 2018.

Barr became the 129th president of the SRU in 2020. His term in office is scheduled to be from 2020 to 2022.

=== Coaching career ===
Barr is a qualified strength and conditioning coach with the SRU.

== Outside of rugby union ==
Barr is a farmer who has a sportsground contracting business. He also works at Midlothian Council as a spin instructor.
