= 1975 Scotland rugby union tour of New Zealand =

Series of matches played by the Scotland national rugby union team

Summary
P	W	D	L
Total
7	4	0	3
Test match
1	0	0	1
Opponent
P	W	D	L
New Zealand
1	0	0	1

The 1975 Scotland rugby union tour of New Zealand was a series of seven matches played by the Scotland national rugby union team in New Zealand in May and June 1975. The Scotland team won four of their matches and lost the other three. They lost the only international match against the New Zealand national rugby union team (the All Blacks) in a game played in a downpour on a saturated pitch.

== Matches ==
Scores and results list Scotland's points tally first.

Opponent	Result	For	Against	Date	Venue
Nelson Bays	Won	51	6	24 May	Trafalgar Park, Nelson
Otago	Lost	15	19	27 May	Carisbrook, Dunedin
Canterbury	Lost	9	20	31 May	Lancaster Park, Christchurch
Hawke's Bay	Won	30	0	4 June	McLean Park, Napier
Wellington	Won	36	25	7 June	Athletic Park, Wellington
Bay of Plenty	Won	16	10	10 June	Rugby Park, Rotorua
New Zealand	Lost	0	24	14 June	Eden Park, Auckland

== Touring party ==
- Manager: George Burrell
- Assistant manager: Bill Dickinson
- Captain: Ian McLauchlan

=== Backs ===
- David Bell
- Graham Birkett
- Lewis Dick
- John Frame
- Bruce Hay
- Andy Irvine
- Alan Lawson
- Ian McGeechan
- Dougie Morgan
- Jim Renwick
- Billy Steele
- Colin Telfer

=== Forwards ===
- Ian Barnes
- Mike Biggar
- Sandy Carmichael
- Colin Fisher
- Wilson Lauder
- David Leslie
- George Mackie
- Duncan Madsen
- Alastair McHarg
- Ian McLauchlan
- Norman Pender
- Alan Tomes
- Bill Watson
