= Oban Lorne RFC =

Scottish rugby union club, based in Oban

- Union: Scottish Rugby Union
- Founded: 1962
- Ground(s): Glencruitten
- League(s): Men: West Division Two; Women: Scottish Womens West One
- 2019–20: Men: West Division Two, 7th of 10; Women: Scottish Womens West One
Team kit

Oban Lorne RFC is a Scottish rugby union club based in Oban, Argyll and Bute.

== History ==
The club run a men and women's XV.

The men play in the West Division Two.

The women play in Scottish Womens West One.

== Sevens ==
The club run the Oban Sevens. The tournament began in 1974.

== Honours ==
=== Men ===
- West Regional League Division 2
  - Champions (1): 2015
- RBS National Bowl
  - Champions (1): 2013

=== Women ===
- Women's Bowl
  - Champions (1): 2018

== Notable former players ==
=== Glasgow Warriors players ===
- (New Zealand) Aaron Collins

=== Scotland international players ===
- (Scotland) Magnus Bradbury
