= 1927 Five Nations Championship =

Rugby union competition

- Date: 1 January - 2 April 1927
- Countries: England; France; Ireland; Scotland; Wales

Tournament statistics
- Champions: Ireland and Scotland
- Matches played: 10

The 1927 Five Nations Championship was the thirteenth series of the rugby union Five Nations Championship following the inclusion of France into the Home Nations Championship. Including the previous Home Nations Championships, this was the fortieth series of the annual northern hemisphere rugby union championship. Ten matches were played between 1 January and 2 April. It was contested by England, France, Ireland, Scotland and Wales.

== Table ==
Pos	Team	Pld	W	D	L	PF	PA	PD	Pts
1	Scotland	4	3	0	1	49	25	+24	6
1	Ireland	4	3	0	1	39	20	+19	6
3	England	4	2	0	2	32	39	−7	4
4	Wales	4	1	0	3	43	42	+1	2
4	France	4	1	0	3	19	56	−37	2

== Results ==
1927-01-01

France	3–8	Ireland

Paris
Referee: Robert Scott

1927-01-15

England	11–9	Wales

London
Referee: Robert Scott

1927-01-15

Scotland	23–6	France

Edinburgh

1927-02-05

Wales	0–5	Scotland

Cardiff

1927-02-12

England	8–6	Ireland

London

1927-02-26

Wales	25–7	France

Swansea

1927-02-26

Ireland	6–0	Scotland

Dublin

1927-03-12

Ireland	19–9	Wales

Dublin

1927-03-19

Scotland	21–13	England

Edinburgh
Referee: Noel Purcell

1927-04-02

France	3–0	England

Paris
