= Keith Wallace (wine writer) =

American oenologist and wine critic

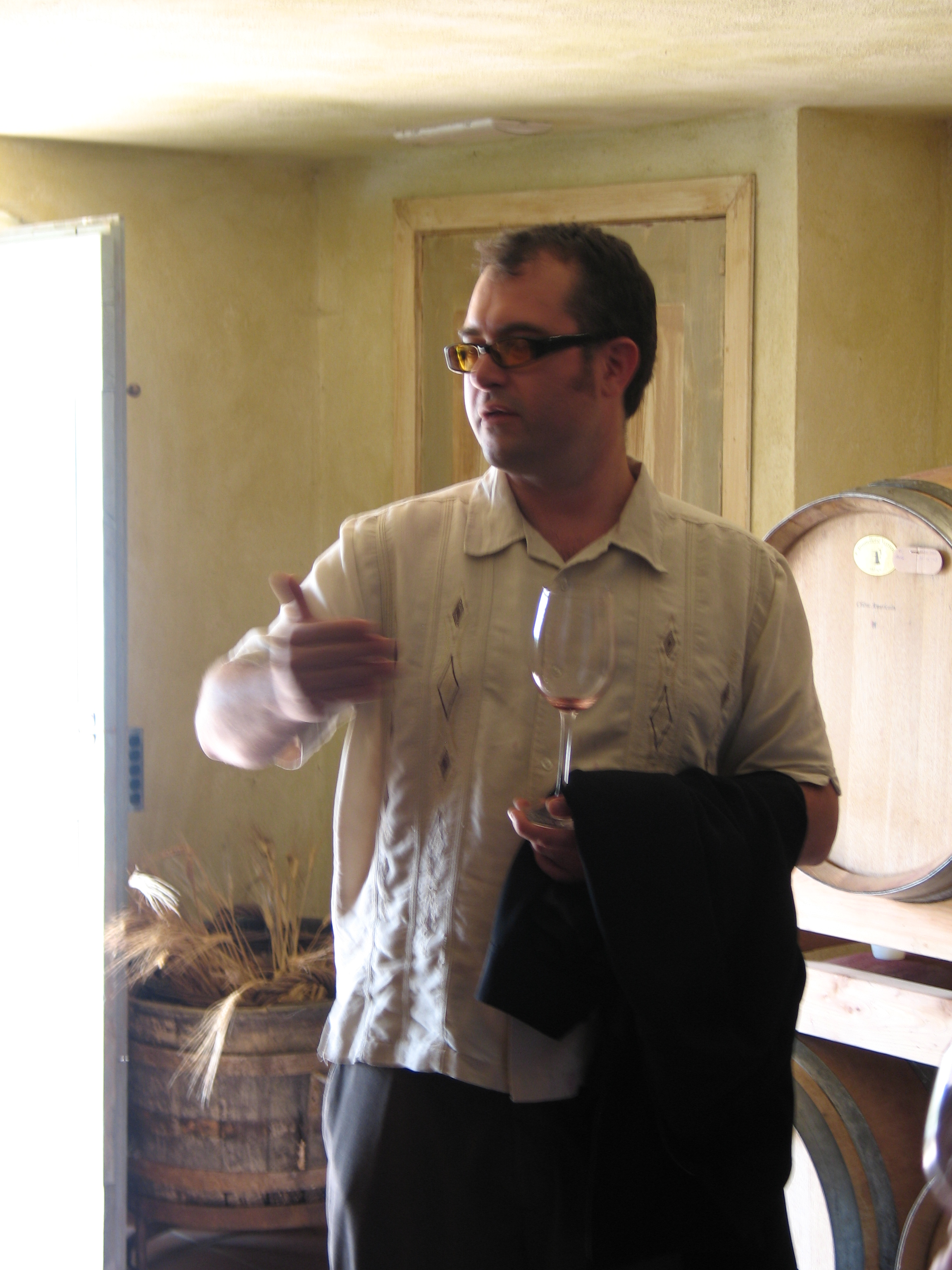
- A winemaking lesson in Tuscany

Keith Wallace is an American wine educator, writer, and former chef. He is the founder of the Wine School of Philadelphia, established in 2001. Wallace has contributed to the field of wine education through writing, teaching, and media appearances, and is the author of the cookbook Corked & Forked: Four Seasons of Eats and Drinks (2011).

== Career ==
Wallace worked as a chef in Baltimore before transitioning into wine education. After studying enology, he worked as a wine consultant and distributor partner.

In 2001, Wallace founded the Wine School of Philadelphia. He has described the school's mission as promoting unbiased, accessible wine education in contrast to industry-sponsored tastings and instruction. The Wine School later moved to a Victorian building in the Rittenhouse neighborhood of Philadelphia in 2011.

Wallace has appeared in national and regional media as a wine expert. In 2009, he was featured on NPR's All Things Considered discussing mass-produced wine. He was also involved in a trademark dispute with World Wrestling Entertainment over the Wine School's event name "Sommelier Smackdown," which drew media attention.

In 2012, CBS News named Wallace one of Philadelphia's top sommeliers. He has been featured in local publications including Philadelphia Inquirer, Philadelphia Magazine, and Philadelphia City Paper for his work in wine education and writing.

== Writing ==
Wallace is the author of Corked & Forked: Four Seasons of Eats and Drinks (2011), published by Running Press. The book combines seasonal menus with beverage pairings and reflects Wallace's background in both cooking and wine. It received positive reviews from Publishers Weekly and Library Journal.

== Personal life ==
Wallace married Alana Zerbe, a sommelier and collaborator at the Wine School, in 2011. As of the late 2010s, the couple has also collaborated on podcast and educational ventures related to wine.
