= Eddie McKeating =

Scotland international rugby union player

- Born: Edward McKeating; 1 September 1936 Edinburgh, Scotland
- Died: 2 May 2021 (aged 84) Newcastle, England

Rugby union career
- Position: Centre
Amateur team(s)
Years	Team	Apps	(Points)
1951 -	Heriots		
- London Scottish
- Combined Services
- Heriots
1963 -	West of Scotland		
Provincial / State sides
Years	Team	Apps	(Points)
1957	Edinburgh District		
- Kent
1960 1963-	Cities District; Glasgow District		
International career
Years	Team	Apps	(Points)
1957-61	Scotland	6	(0)

Eddie McKeating (1 September 1936 – 2 May 2021) was a Scotland international rugby union player.

== Rugby Union career ==
=== Amateur career ===
McKeating played for Heriots.

His first match for the 1st XV at the Edinburgh club was at emergency cover at scrum-half, when he was only 15. He was playing as a centre with the 3rd XV when he was promoted. He was injured in that first 1st XV match, and he had to get his spleen removed.

He moved to England where he completed his National Service. He played for London Scottish and the military Combined Services team when there.

On his return to Edinburgh he resumed playing for Heriots. With Heriots he won the Melrose Sevens in 1957 and 1958.

He later moved to play for West of Scotland when he was promoted by William Thyne & Co. While with West of Scotland, they shared the Scottish Unofficial Championship of 1964-65.

=== Provincial career ===
McKeating was capped by Edinburgh District. They won the Scottish Inter-District Championship in season 1960-61.

Whilst in England for National Service he played for Kent.

He played for Cities District, against Paris on 12 November 1960.

On moving to Glasgow, he then played for Glasgow District, and played for them in the 1963 inter-city against Edinburgh District.

=== International career ===
McKeating was capped 6 times for Scotland between 1957 and 1961.

== Business career ==
He had a career working in packaging, helped by former Scotland player Douglas Muir who had risen to be Managing Director in the firm William Thyne & Co.

Through this career he moved first to Glasgow; before settling in Newcastle, as a Sales Director for Fields Packaging in the 1980s.
