= Keith Wallace (rugby union) =

130th President of the Scottish Rugby Union

- Born: Haddington, Scotland

Rugby union career
Amateur team(s)
Years	Team	Apps	(Points)
1969 - 2020	Haddington		

131st President of the Scottish Rugby Union
- Incumbent
- Assumed office 2024
- Preceded by: Colin Rigby

Keith Wallace is a Scottish former rugby union player. He is the 131st president of the Scottish Rugby Union; the 130th person to hold the office.

== Rugby Union career ==
=== Amateur career ===
Wallace played for Haddington since 1969 and last played for their second team in January 2020.

=== Administrative career ===
He became a president of Haddington RFC in 2018, after spending 10 years on the club committee.

He has been supporting Rwandan rugby since 2014 working with Penguins International Rugby Football Trust and the Friends of Rwandan Rugby; and helping the Rwanda Rugby Federation.

He is the secretary and co-founder of Bloody Rugby, a charity aimed at raising awareness of blood cancers.

He was voted a vice-president of the Scottish Rugby Union in 2020.

Wallace became the 131st president of the Scottish Rugby Union on 28 November 2024. His term in office is scheduled to be from 2024 to 2026.

== Business career ==
Wallace had a career in British Rail, before moving into consultancy and then becoming the chairman of Crossrail International. He is also a director of the charity Scottish Autism.
