= Fred McLeod (rugby union) =

Scottish rugby union player (1939–2019)

- Born: Frederick Charles Hubert McLeod; 2 May 1939 Edinburgh, Scotland
- Died: 25 December 2019 (aged 80) Edinburgh, Scotland
- School: Daniel Stewart's College
- University: University of Edinburgh

Rugby union career
- Position: Full-back
Amateur team(s)
Years	Team	Apps	(Points)
1957-70	Stewart's College FP		

110th President of the Scottish Rugby Union
- In office 1996–1997
- Preceded by: Iain Todd
- Succeeded by: Charlie Ritchie

Fred McLeod (2 May 1939 – 25 December 2019) was a Scottish rugby union player. He became the 110th President of the Scottish Rugby Union.

== Rugby union career ==
=== Amateur career ===
McLeod went to Daniel Stewart's College in Edinburgh. He played rugby for the school team.

He then played for Stewart's College FP. He played for the club for 23 years until in 1970 a detached retina forced him to quit his playing career.

=== Administrative career ===
He became a club selector of Stewart's College FP in 1970.

When Stewart's College FP and Melville College FP merged in 1973 to form Stewart's Melville, McLeod became Secretary of the new club. He later became President of Stewart's Melville.

In 1979 he was secretary of the Co-Optimists. He managed them to the final of the Hong Kong Sevens in 1981 and the quarter-finals in 1986. He also took the side on tour to Zimbabwe and later became a President of the Co-Optimists.

He was elected to the SRU committee in 1981.

He became SRU Vice-president in 1985.

He became the 110th President of the Scottish Rugby Union. He served one year from 1996 to 1997.

His spell of the Presidency was notable as he had to deal with the new professional era of rugby union in Scotland. Despite the SRU professionalising the District sides, the situation was tense as many still argued that the club sides should be turned professional instead.

McLeod was one of the three IRB members who recommended professionalism for the sport in a 1995 report. The National newspaper concluded: 'Fred got pelters for that around Murrayfield but stood his ground and was proven correct' and also backed Jim Telfer in his view that the District sides should be professional and not the club sides.

McLeod also had to deal with England's expulsion from the Five Nations Championship in 1996. This was short-term and England played in the next tournament.

He had to step in as SRU chairman in 2005 when the previous chairman David Mackay and chief executive Phil Anderton were forced out of the post. This lasted until the summer of that year when Allan Munro took over as chairman; and Gordon McKie became the chief executive.

== Tributes ==
Andy Irvine:

Freddie was rugby through and through. He was a great servant to the game and I really enjoyed working with him.
