= Magnus Bradbury =

Scotland international rugby union player

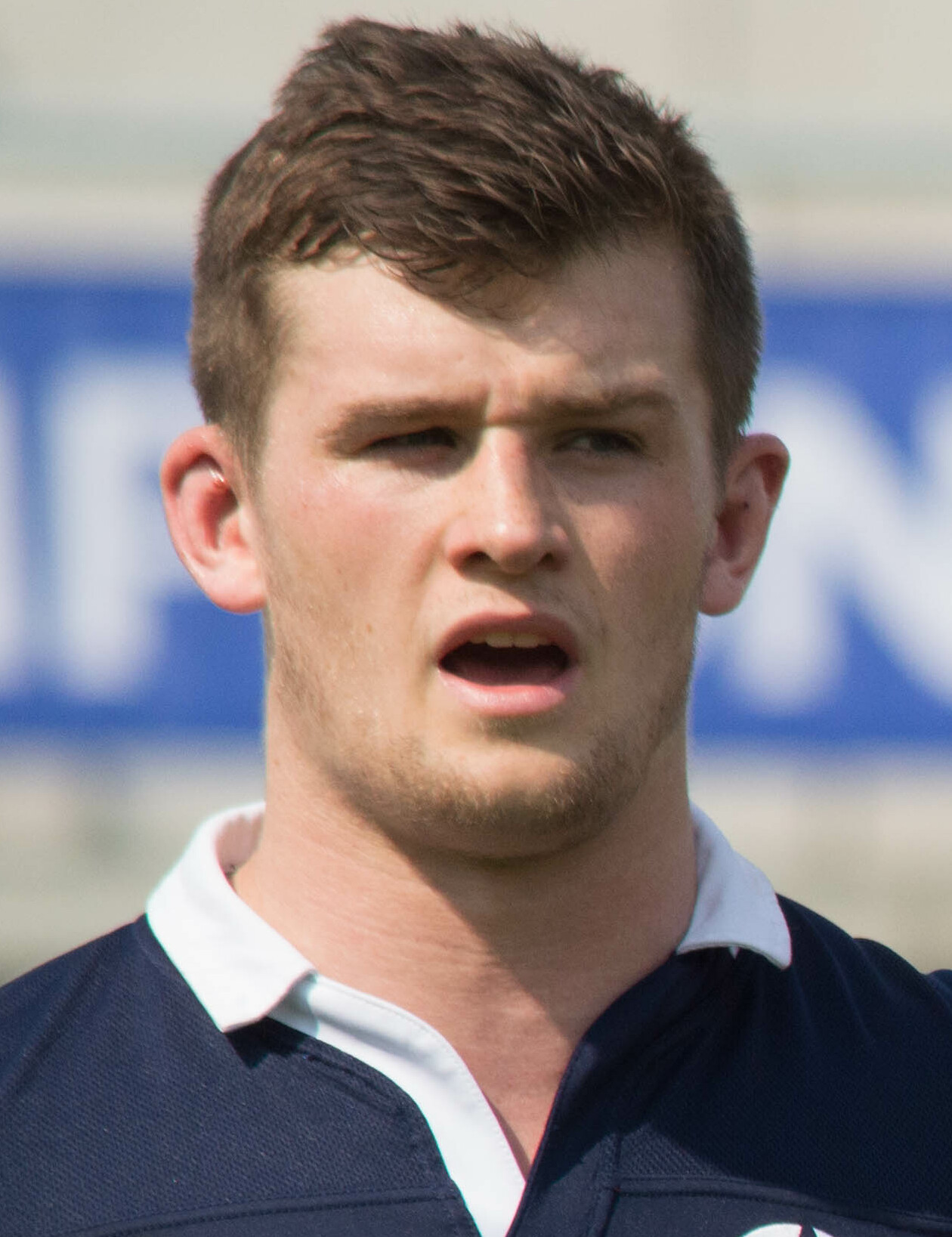
- Born: Magnus Donald Blackburn Bradbury; 23 August 1995 (age 31) Glasgow, Scotland
- Height: 1.93 m (6 ft 4 in)
- Weight: 116 kg (18 st 4 lb; 256 lb)
- School: Oban High School, Merchiston Castle School

Rugby union career
- Position: Flanker / Number Eight
- Current team: Edinburgh Rugby
Senior career
Years	Team	Apps	(Points)
2015–2022	Edinburgh Rugby	113	(75)
2022–2024	Bristol Bears	19	(20)
2024–	Edinburgh Rugby	15	(20)
- Correct as of 17 April 2025
International career
Years	Team	Apps	(Points)
2012	Scotland U17		
2013	Scotland U18	3	(0)
2014–2015	Scotland U20	20	(5)
2016–	Scotland	24	(15)
2022-	Scotland 'A'	2	(0)
- Correct as of 22 July 2026
National sevens team
Years	Team		Comps
2015–2016	Scotland		2

18th Sir Willie Purves Quaich
- In office 2017–2017
- Preceded by: Mark Bennett
- Succeeded by: Matt Fagerson

Magnus Donald Blackburn Bradbury (born 23 August 1995) is a Scotland international rugby union player who plays for Edinburgh Rugby in the United Rugby Championship.

== Rugby Union career ==
=== Amateur career ===
Bradbury started playing rugby with Oban Lorne. From Oban High School, Bradbury secured a scholarship to study at Merchiston Castle School.

In April 2015 he won the BT Scottish Cup with Boroughmuir in their 55–17 win against the Border club Hawick scoring two tries.

=== Professional career ===
As Oban is affiliated to Glasgow, Bradbury first represented Glasgow District at under-16 and under-17 levels - but with his move to Merchiston he came under Edinburgh's catchment area. Bradbury then represented Edinburgh District at under-18

Magnus made his professional début for Edinburgh in their Guinness PRO12 clash away to Leinster on Hallowe'en 2014.

On Monday 28 August 2017 Bradbury was announced as Edinburgh Rugby captain for the 2017/18 Pro14 season.

In March 2022 Bradbury announced he would leave Edinburgh Rugby and join Bristol Bears at the start of the 2022/23 Premiership Rugby season.

Following an impressive first season in England, Bradbury was named Bristol's Player's Player of the Year.

At the end of the 2023–24 season it was announced that Bradbury would return to Edinburgh, with the player stating that he wished to build on his strong Bristol form and force his way back into the Scotland squad.

=== International career ===
Bradbury has represented Scotland U17 and Scotland U18. He made his U18 international debut, coming off the bench, against England in March 2013 - and he then made the starting XV in the U18 victories over Ireland and Wales.

His Scotland U20 debut came against the Irish in Athlone, in January 2014 and he scored his first try against Argentina in the final play-off game in the 2014 IRB JWC in Auckland.

He made his 7s début in 2015 at the Dubai 7s reaching the Plate final.

On Saturday 19 November 2016 Bradbury earned his first cap at full Scotland international level. Starting at 6 in an Autumn Test against Argentina he played a part in Scotland's remarkable 19-16 winning performance at Murrayfield Stadium.

He was called up to the 2019 Rugby World Cup squad on 8 September 2019 as injury cover as Jamie Ritchie fractured his cheekbone.

He played for Scotland 'A' on 6 February 2026 in their match against Italy XV.
