= Craig Stanley (cricketer) =

English cricketer

Personal information
- Full name: Craig Stanley
- Born: 17 December 1971 (age 54); North Shields, Northumberland, England
- Batting: Right-handed
- Bowling: Right-arm fast-medium

Domestic team information
- Years: Team
- 1991–2000: Northumberland

Career statistics
Competition	List A
Matches	3
Runs scored	0
Batting average	0.00
100s/50s	–/–
Top score	0
Balls bowled	192
Wickets	3
Bowling average	45.00
5 wickets in innings	–
10 wickets in match	–
Best bowling	2/66
Catches/stumpings	1/–
- Source: Cricinfo, 30 June 2011

Craig Stanley (born 17 December 1971) is a former English cricketer. Stanley was a right-handed batsman who bowled right-arm fast-medium. He was born in North Shields, Northumberland.

Stanley made his debut for Northumberland in the 1991 Minor Counties Championship against Bedfordshire. He played Minor counties cricket for Northumberland from 1991 to 2000, which included 50 Minor Counties Championship matches and 10 MCCA Knockout Trophy matches. He made his List A debut against Nottinghamshire in the 1994 NatWest Trophy. He made 2 further List A matches for the county, against the Northamptonshire Cricket Board and Bedfordshire, both in the 2000 NatWest Trophy. In his 3 List A matches, he took 3 wickets at a bowling average of 45.00, with best figures of 2/66.

He also played Second XI cricket for the Essex, Durham and Somerset Second XIs.

Stanley studied at Durham University, where he competed for the university side.
