= Alastair McTavish =

Scottish cricketer and banker

Personal information
- Full name: Alastair Kenneth McTavish
- Born: 22 December 1904; Rothiemay, Banffshire, Scotland
- Died: 23 March 1961 (aged 56); Newton Mearns, Renfrewshire, Scotland
- Batting: Right-handed
- Role: Wicket-keeper

Domestic team information
- Years: Team
- 1929–1939: Scotland

Career statistics
Competition	First-class
Matches	15
Runs scored	675
Batting average	25.96
100s/50s	1/3
Top score	109
Catches/stumpings	9/4
- Source: Cricinfo, 25 June 2022

Alastair Kenneth McTavish (22 December 1904 — 23 March 1961) was a Scottish first-class cricketer and banker.

McTavish was born in December 1904 at Rothiemay, Banffshire. He was educated at the Royal High School, Edinburgh. McIntyre made his debut for Scotland in a first-class cricket match against Ireland at Dublin in 1929. He played first-class cricket for Scotland on a further fourteen appearances to 1939, playing seven matches against Ireland the remainder against touring international sides and county teams. Playing as a wicket-keeper, he scored 675 runs at an average of 25.96; he made three half centuries and one century, a score of 109 against the touring South Americans in 1932. As wicket-keeper, he took nine catches and made four stumpings. A banker by profession, McTavish died in March 1961 at Newton Mearns, Renfrewshire.
