= Scottish Rugby Union =

Governing body of rugby union in Scotland

Aonadh Rugbaidh na h-Alba
- Sport: Rugby union
- Founded: 3 March 1873; 153 years ago
- World Rugby affiliation: 1886 (founder)
- FIRA-AER affiliation: 1999
- Headquarters: Murrayfield Stadium; Edinburgh; EH12 5PJ
- Location: 55°56′32.07″N 3°14′27.38″W
- Patron: Anne, Princess Royal
- President: Keith Wallace
- Men's coach: Gregor Townsend
- Women's coach: Sione Fukofuka
- Sevens coach: Ciaran Beattie
- Website: scottishrugby.org

The Scottish Rugby Union (SRU; Scottish Gaelic: Aonadh Rugbaidh na h-Alba) is the governing body of rugby union in Scotland. Now marketed as Scottish Rugby, it is the second-oldest Rugby Union, having been founded in 1873. The SRU oversees the national league system, known as the Scottish League Championship, and the Scottish National teams. The SRU is headed by the President (Keith Wallace) and Chairman (John McGuigan), with Mark Dodson acting as the chief executive officer. Dee Bradbury became the first female president of a Tier 1 rugby nation upon her appointment on 4 August 2018.

== History ==
=== 1873–1920s ===
The Scottish Football Union was founded on Monday 3 March 1873 at a meeting held at Glasgow Academy, Elmbank Street, Glasgow. Eight clubs were represented at the foundation, Glasgow Academicals; Edinburgh Academical Football Club; West of Scotland F.C.; University of St Andrews Rugby Football Club; Royal High School FP; Merchistonians; Edinburgh University RFC; and Glasgow University. Five of these clubs were, at the time of founding the Scottish Football Union, already members of the previously instituted Rugby Football Union. Although the RFU now represents exclusively English clubs, in its first few years it had members from outside England, there being no other national union. West of Scotland, Glasgow Academicals and Edinburgh University had joined the RFU in 1871 and Edinburgh Academicals and Royal High School FP had joined in 1872. These five renounced membership of the RFU to join the SFU.

The SFU was a founding member of the one and only International Rugby Football Board, now known as World Rugby, in 1886 with Ireland and Wales. (England refused to join until 1890.)

In 1924 the SFU changed its name to become the Scottish Rugby Union. International games were played at Inverleith from 1899 to 1925 when Murrayfield was opened.

=== 1990s–present ===
The SRU owns Murrayfield Stadium which is the main home ground of the Scottish national team, though in 2004 international rugby games were played at Hampden Park in Glasgow and McDiarmid Park in Perth, as part of the SRU's campaign to reach out to new audiences outside the traditional rugby areas.

When the Heineken Cup (now replaced by the European Rugby Champions Cup) was suggested SRU officials were concerned that Scottish club sides could not compete against the best teams from France and England and that centrally funded so-called 'super-district' teams might do better.

The four traditional districts—the South (renamed Border Reivers), Edinburgh, Glasgow and the North & Midlands (rebranded as Caledonia Reds)—were given the go-ahead to take part in Europe. For the first two seasons, players were still released to play for their clubs in domestic competition, but eventually the districts became full-time operations.

Then financial difficulties – the SRU's high debt, partly as a result of the redevelopment of Murrayfield – called for retrenchment. After two seasons, financial difficulties forced the SRU to merge the four teams into two. Edinburgh merged with the Border Reivers to form a team to be known as Edinburgh Reivers. Glasgow merged with Caledonian to form a team to be known as Glasgow Caledonian.

The Borders was resurrected in 2002 and joined the second season of the Celtic League, now known as the United Rugby Championship. As a consequence Edinburgh Reivers became simply Edinburgh Rugby and Glasgow became Glasgow Rugby. In 2005, all three teams adopted new names. The Borders readopted the name Border Reivers; Edinburgh became Edinburgh Gunners, but would revert to Edinburgh in 2006 due to Arsenal F.C. owning the "Gunners" trademark; and Glasgow became Glasgow Warriors. Furthermore, the SRU planned to have a world-class rugby side for each city or large town in Scotland, when financial circumstances permitted.

In 2007, The Borders team was disbanded yet again as a result of continuing financial difficulties. In the same year, the SRU began organising the Scotland Sevens, first held in Edinburgh and later in Glasgow. For several years, it was the final event in the annual Sevens World Series, but that distinction now belongs to Madrid.

On 21 November 2009 Scotland beat Australia 9–8 after 17 attempts in 27 years.

=== Centenary celebrations ===
The SRU celebrated its centenary in 1973 with a number of events. Among these was the 1973 International Seven-A-Side Tournament, the first sevens tournament to have national representative sides. The programme for that event also sported the new coat of arms of the SRU that was granted by the Lord Lyon King of Arms on 28 February 1973, for the centenary season. The coat of arms is still in use today, but in the main the SRU use the commercial thistle logo on jerseys and stationery. The coat of arms has the motto "Non Sine Gloria", meaning "Not Without Glory".

== Domestic Rugby ==
The SRU oversees the national league system, known as the Scottish League Championship, and consisting of:

- a Premiership of 20 teams across 2 divisions.
- a National Leagues of 20 teams across 2 regional divisions.
- Regional Leagues of 150 clubs in 18 divisions across three regions

It also oversees the Scottish Cup. It is not directly responsible for local, university or 2nd XV leagues.

=== Women's & Girls Rugby ===
See also Scottish Women's Rugby.

Since the Scottish Women's Rugby Union merged with Scottish Rugby in 2009 the governing body also oversees Women's Fixtures.

- Tennent's Women's Premier League 2018–19
- Tennent's Women's National League 1 2018–19
- Tennent's Women's National League 2 2018–19
- Tennent's Women's North League 2018-19
- Women's National Development League 2018-19

A National Cup competition:

- Sarah Beaney Cup 2015–16
- BT Women's Bowl

Regional Cup Competition:

- Donna Kennedy Cup

== National teams ==
The SRU oversees Scotland's national teams. The most prominent team is the Scotland national rugby union team, which competes in the Six Nations tournament every year and in the Rugby World Cup every four years. The SRU also oversees the Scotland national sevens team, which competes every year in the World Rugby Sevens Series. And the SRU oversees the Scotland national women's rugby team.

The head coach of the Scotland national rugby union team is Gregor Townsend, who began in June 2017. Scott Johnson is Director of Rugby.

The head coach of the Scottish national women's rugby team is Shade Munro.

== North American initiatives ==
On 28 March 2019, the SRU announced that it had taken a minority stake in Old Glory DC, a team set to begin play in Major League Rugby (MLR), the current top level of the sport in the United States and Canada, in 2020. As MLR operates on a "single-entity" business model similar to the two countries' Major League Soccer, with the league owning all teams and the team operators being league shareholders, this effectively meant that the SRU had taken a small stake in MLR itself.

== Personnel ==
The current president is Keith Wallace, who succeeded Colin Rigby in 2024. John McGuigan was appointed chair in May 2023. The Chief Executive Officer is Mark Dodson.

In May 2014, it was announced that Sheila Begbie had been appointed to the newly created post of Head of Women's Rugby, reporting directly to the Director of Rugby and she was due to commence this role in August 2014.

== See also ==
- Rugby union in Scotland
- Murrayfield Stadium
- Edinburgh 7s
- Scottish Women's Rugby
