= President of the Scottish Rugby Union =

- Incumbent; Keith Wallace since 2024

The president of the Scottish Rugby Union is the figurehead of rugby union in Scotland.

== Origin ==
In 1873, and directly after the Scotland versus England international match, representatives from eight Scottish rugby union sides came together in Glasgow at the Glasgow Academy in Elmbank Street. They decided to form an organisation to develop the sport in Scotland. It was initially called the Scottish Football Union, but changed its name to the Scottish Rugby Union to give clarity from association football.

They had a number of initial aims:- to help promote a cup competition; to bring closer working between the Scottish clubs; and to form a committee so that the Scotland international team could be picked.

A committee was thus formed and John Chiene was nominated as the chair. Chiene thus became the first president of the Scottish Rugby Union.

== Powers and duties ==
The objective of the president of the SRU is to ensure a coordinated, collegiate approach to working with all stakeholders in the game.

Each president holds the role of chairman of the Scottish Rugby Council concurrently when in office.

=== Ceremonial roles ===
The president of the Scottish Rugby Union has performed many ceremonial roles to promote the sport in Scotland. These have included presenting the match ball in the Six Nations Championship; and providing International players with their caps.

== Selection process ==
The member clubs provide candidates for election as president of the Scottish Rugby Union. Usually two candidates are nominated; the first three-way candidate election was in 2007.

It is common for the vice-president to win the backing of the clubs when the president steps down from the role. The office of vice-president is also an elected one.

=== Election ===
The members clubs of the Scottish Rugby Union vote to see who becomes president. The vote is held at the Annual General Meeting; and is ratified at the AGM.

== Tenure ==
The post was traditionally a one-year term, but presidents were allowed to run for office for a subsequent year.

John Chiene is the only president to hold the role for two distinct time periods, becoming the first and fifth president. This is now prohibited by Bye-Law 12.4 which states:-

Without prejudice to interim appointments made under Bye-Law 12.8 or Bye-Law 12.10, a person is only eligible to be elected once as Vice-President and to hold office once as President.

Tom Scott held the post before and after the First World War. There were no presidents elected during the conflict and his two terms can be considered contiguous. Indeed, sources usually attribute his period for the entire war.

The Second World War meant Presidencys were longer: Patrick Munro was president from 1939 to 1942; and Harry Smith took over from 1942 until 1947.

In 2016, Rob Flockhart became the first 'two-term' president. This rule-change meant that Flockhart - and subsequent presidents - could serve two years without standing for election for the second term.
