= 1954–55 Scottish Inter-District Championship =

Rugby union competition

- Countries: Scotland
- Date: 1954–55
- Champions: South
- Runners-up: Glasgow District
- Matches played: 6

The 1954–55 Scottish Inter-District Championship was a rugby union competition for Scotland's district teams.

This season saw the second formal Scottish Inter-District Championship.

The district sides selected were Glasgow District, Edinburgh District, North and Midlands and South.

South won the competition with a maximum three wins.

== 1954-55 League Table ==
Team	P	W	D	L	PF	PA	+/-	Pts
South	3	3	0	0	35	14	+21	6
Glasgow District	3	1	1	1	40	30	+10	3
Edinburgh District	3	1	1	1	23	17	+6	3
North and Midlands	3	0	0	3	11	48	-37	0

== Results ==
Date	Try	Conversion	Penalty	Dropped goal	Goal from mark	Notes
1948–1970	3 points	2 points	3 points	3 points	3 points	

=== Round 1 ===
16 October 1954

Glasgow District	11 – 18	South
Try: D. W. Reid; Angus Cameron; Con: Allan Cameron; Pen: Hamish Kemp	Preview; Report; Report	Try: T. Grieve; C. Elliot x 3 Con: C. Elliot; J. L. Allan x 2

Old Anniesland
Referee: R. M. Morrison (Watsonians)

Glasgow District: Angus Cameron (Glasgow HSFP), T. E. S. Fergusson (Hillhead HSFP), Allan Cameron (Hillhead HSFP),
W. Fraser (Ardrossan Academicals), A. G. Campbell (Kelvinside Academicals), J. T. Docherty (Glasgow HSFP), R. Munro (Jordanhill RFC),
D. W. Reid (Allan Glen's F.P), G. M. Guthrie (Hillhead HSFP), F. I. Hogarth (West of Scotland), F. I. Blake (Kilmarnock),
Hamish Kemp (Glasgow HSFP) [captain], T. S. Smith (Glasgow University), I. A. A. MacGregor (Hillhead HSFP), H. Roddan (Hutcheson's GSFP)
South: J. R. McCreadie (Hawick), T. Grieve (Langholm), R. G. Charters (Hawick), Les Allan (Melrose), C. Elliot (Langholm),
J. M. Maxwell (Langholm), J. Dun (Melrose), A. McEwan (Melrose), J. Telford (Langholm), I. Hastie (Kelso), J. J. Hegarty (Hawick),
A. Robson (Hawick), H. Duffy (Jedforest), J. Grant (Hawick), A. K. McRae (Gala)

=== Round 2 ===
30 October 1954

Edinburgh District	14 – 5	North and Midlands
Try: W. S. Glen x 2 K. C. Sutherland x 2 Con: J. C. M. Sharp	Preview; Report	Try: E. Rogers; Con: W. Steven

Murrayfield Stadium
Referee: J. Imrie (Hawick)

Edinburgh District: J. A. C. Gilbert (Stewart's College F. P.), K. G. Sutherland (Melville's College F. P.), Ken Dalgleish (Edinburgh Wanderers),
E. C. Barclay-Smith (Edinburgh Wanderers), T. G. Weatherstone (Stewart's College F. P.) [captain], Graham Ross (Watsonians),
J. A. Nichol (Royal HSFP), R. D. S. Munro (Leith Academicals), N. G. R. Mair (Edinburgh University), P. S. Shearer (Heriots F. P.),
W. S. Glen (Edinburgh Wanderers), S. T. H. Wright (Stewart's College F. P.), J. C. M. Sharp (Stewart's College F. P.)
North and Midlands: W. Steven (Madras College F. P.), E. H. Cruickshank (Aberdeen GSFP), E. Craig (Aberdeen GSFP),
I. S. Gloag (Perthshire Academicals) [captain], J. K. Morrison (Panmure), I. Stuart (Aberdeen GSFP), R. H. W. Cradock (Aberdeen GSFP),
A. Tullett (Gordonians), I. L. Robb (Aberdeenshire), D. M. Brien (Perthshire Academicals), J. Johnston (Dunfermline),
Ernie Michie (Aberdeen University), M. C. S. Phillip (Aberdeen University), C. D. Mowat (Aberdeen GSFP), E. Rogers (Perthshire Academicals)

=== Round 3 ===
13 November 1954

South	14 – 3	North and Midlands
Try: R. G. Charters x 2 J. J. Hegarty; Con: C. Elliot; Pen: C. Elliot	Preview; Report	Try: E. H. Cruickshank

Philiphaugh Stadium
Referee: R. M. Morrison (Watsonians)

South: R. Chisholm (Melrose), T. Grieve (Langholm), R. G. Charters (Hawick), J. M. Maxwell (Langholm), C. Elliot (Langholm),
J. Hume (Kelso), A. S. Dorward (Gala), I. Hastie (Kelso), Jock King (Selkirk), J. Campbell (Kelso), J. J. Hegarty (Hawick), T. Elliot (Gala),
L. Walker (Selkirk), A. Robson (Hawick) [captain], A. K. McRae (Gala)
North and Midlands: W. Steven (Madras College F. P.), E. H. Cruickshank (Aberdeen GSFP), E. Craig (Aberdeen GSFP),
I. S. Gloag (Perthshire Academicals) [captain], R. H. Gibson (Howe of Fife), I. Stuart (Aberdeen GSFP), R. H. W. Cradock (Aberdeen GSFP),
A. Tullett (Gordonians), I. L. Robb (Aberdeenshire), D. M. Brien (Perthshire Academicals), J. Johnston (Dunfermline),
Ernie Michie (Aberdeen University), J. Greenwood (Dunfermline), C. D. Mowat (Aberdeen GSFP), E. Rogers (Perthshire Academicals)

=== Round 4 ===
20 November 1954

South	3 – 0	Edinburgh District
Pen: C. Elliot	Preview; Report

The Greenyards, Melrose
Referee: Adam Austin (Glasgow HSFP)

South: R. Chisholm (Melrose), C. Elliot (Langholm), R. G. Charters (Hawick), J. M. Maxwell (Langholm), W. J.. Grieve (Gala),
J. Hume (Kelso), J. H. Bowie (Hawick), H. McLeod (Hawick), Jock King (Selkirk), J. Campbell (Kelso), J. J. Hegarty (Hawick), T. Elliot (Gala),
L. H. Walker (Selkirk), A. Robson (Hawick) [captain], A. K. McRae (Gala)
Edinburgh District: J. A. C. Gilbert (Stewart's College F. P.), K. G. Sutherland (Melville's College F. P.), Ken Dalgleish (Edinburgh Wanderers),
H. G. Hay (Edinburgh Academicals), T. G. Weatherstone (Stewart's College F. P.) [captain], Graham Ross (Watsonians), J. A. Nichol (Royal HSFP),
W. M. Stephen (Musselburgh), Bill Relph (Stewart's College F. P.), Douglas Muir (Heriots), D. J. Marshall (Edinburgh Academicals),
C. Y. Langlands (Stewart's College F. P.), W. S. Glen (Edinburgh Wanderers), S. T. H. Wright (Stewart's College F. P.),
William Cowie (Edinburgh Wanderers)

20 November 1954

North and Midlands	3 – 20	Glasgow District
Pen: E. H. Cruickshank	Preview; Report	Try: Angus Cameron x 2 A. Stephen; F. A. Ross; I. A. A. MacGregor x 2 Con: Allan Cameron

Linksfield Stadium, Aberdeen
Referee: A. I. Dickie (Gala)

North and Midlands: W. Steven (Madras College F.P), E. H. Cruickshank (Aberdeen GSFP), I. S. Gloag (Perthshire Academicals), R. H. H. Gibson (Howe of Fife), D. J. McPherson (Gordonians), I. Stuart (Aberdeen GSFP), R. H. W. Cradock (Aberdeen GSFP), A. Tullett (Gordonians), C. W. Bravin (Dunfermline), D. M. Brien (Perthshire Academicals), E. J. S. Michie (Aberdeen University), J. Johnston (Dunfermline), C. D. Mowat (Aberdeen GSFP), E. Rogers (Perthshire Academicals)
Glasgow District: Angus Cameron (Glasgow HSFP), T. E. S. Fergusson (Hillhead HSFP), Allan Cameron (Hillhead HSFP),
W. Fraser (Ardrossan Academicals), A. G. Campbell (Kelvinside Academicals), J. T. Docherty (Glasgow HSFP), F. A. Ross (Hillhead HSFP),
J. C. Dawson (Glasgow Academicals), A. M. Jope (Glasgow University), D. W. Reid (Allan Glen's F.P.), F. I. Blake (Kilmarnock),
Hamish Kemp (Glasgow HSFP) [captain], T. S. Smith (Glasgow University), A. Stephen (Glasgow Academicals), I. A. A. MacGregor (Hillhead HSFP)

=== Round 5 ===
4 December 1954

Glasgow District	9 – 9	Edinburgh District
Try: Percy Friebe; Allan Cameron; Pen: Allan Cameron	Preview; Report	Try: K.G. Sutherland x 2 G.T. Ross

Old Anniesland
Referee: A. I. Dickie (Gala)

Glasgow District: Angus Cameron (Glasgow HSFP), Allan Cameron (Hillhead HSFP), T.E.S. Fergusson (Hillhead HSFP), C.G. Thomson (Glasgow Academicals) [capt], A.G. Campbell (Kelvinside Academicals), J.T. Docherty (Glasgow HSFP), I. A. Ross (Hillhead HSFP), J.C. Dawson (Glasgow Academicals), A.M. Jope (Glasgow University), D. W. Reid (Allan Glen's FP), F.I. Blake (Kilmarnock), Hamish Kemp (Glasgow HSFP), J.S. Ure (Kelvinside Academicals), Percy Friebe (Glasgow HSFP), I.A.A. MacGregor (Hillhead HSFP)
Edinburgh District: D. H. Crighton (Watsonians), K. G. Sutherland (Melville College FP), D. M. Scott (Watsonians), C. Ross (Stewarts College FP), T. G. Weatherstone (Stewarts College FP) [capt], G. T. Ross (Watsonians), J. A. Nichol (RHS FP), F. Maclachlan (Edinburgh Wanderers), Bill Relph (Stewarts College FP), W. Murchison (Boroughmuir FP), C. Y. Langlands (Stewarts College FP), D. J. Marshall (Edinburgh Academicals), W. S. Glen (Edinburgh Wanderers), T. A. Herdman (Melville College FP), W. I. D. Elliot (Edinburgh Academicals)

== Matches outwith the Championship ==
=== Other Scottish matches ===
6 October 1954

Fife	8 – 17	Edinburgh District
	Preview; Report

McKane Park, Dunfermline

Fife:
Edinburgh District:

9 October 1954

Rest of the West	–	Glasgow District

Rest of the West:
Glasgow District:

23 October 1954

Midlands District	–	North of Scotland District

North of Scotland District:
Midlands District:

=== Junior matches ===
23 October 1954

South	–	Edinburgh

Edinburgh District:
South of Scotland District:

20 November 1954

East	–	West

East:
West:

=== Trial matches ===
27 November 1954

Blues Trial	18 – 5	Whites Trial
	Report

Murrayfield Stadium
Referee: j. A. S. Taylor (Musselburgh)

Blues Trial:
Whites Trial:

18 December 1954

Scotland Probables	8 – 9	Scotland Possibles
	Report

Murrayfield Stadium
Referee: Adam Austin (Glasgow HSFP)

Probables:
Possibles:

=== English matches ===
29 September 1954

Edinburgh District	–	Northumberland

Edinburgh

Edinburgh District:
Northumberland:

=== International matches ===
None.
