= 1953–54 Scottish Inter-District Championship =

Rugby union competition

- Countries: Scotland
- Date: 1953–54
- Champions: Edinburgh District
- Runners-up: South
- Matches played: 6
- Top point scorer: Norman Mair (15)
- Top try scorer: I. W. Nicholl (2); L. B. Mackenzie (2); Jim Davidson (2); J. S. Glen (2); Robin Charters (2); J. M. Maxwell (2)

The 1953–54 Scottish Inter-District Championship was a rugby union competition for Scotland's district teams.

This season saw the first formal Scottish Inter-District Championship. The district sides selected were Glasgow District, Edinburgh District, North and South.

The Midlands district was not represented. Instead their players were selected in the formation of the North side.

This was the only season that North played in the Scottish Inter-District Championship. Midlands complained to the Scottish Rugby Union that despite having several players selected in the North of Scotland side they had no recognition for this. The SRU agreed and in subsequent seasons the combined team was known as North and Midlands in the Inter-District tournament.

The case for rugby substitutes was raised after the Glasgow - Edinburgh inter-city match when Glasgow's star player Angus Cameron left the field injured. Not only did this hamper Glasgow by playing with a man short, but their players complained that their selection chances to the national team were impaired by then being forced to play unfamiliar positions to cover the loss.

Edinburgh District won the inaugural competition with a maximum three wins.

== 1953-54 League Table ==
Team	P	W	D	L	PF	PA	+/-	Pts
Edinburgh District	3	3	0	0	53	18	+35	6
South	3	2	0	1	39	22	+17	4
Glasgow District	3	1	0	2	28	20	+8	2
North	3	0	0	3	28	88	-60	0

== Results ==
Date	Try	Conversion	Penalty	Dropped goal	Goal from mark	Notes
1948–1970	3 points	2 points	3 points	3 points	3 points	

=== Round 1 ===
30 September 1953

Edinburgh District	8 – 3	South
Try: Douglas Elliot; R. G. Baird; Con: Douglas Elliot	Preview; Report	Pen: J. Wright

Goldenacre Sports Ground
Referee: Adam Austin (Glasgow HSFP)

Edinburgh District: D. H. Crighton (Watsonians), D. M. Scott (Watsonians), R. G. Baird (Watsonians), Tommy McClung (Edinburgh Academicals),
Grant Weatherstone (Stewart's College FP), Jim Davidson (Edinburgh University), A. D. Thomson (Heriots F.P),
R. D. S. Munro (Leith Academicals), Norman Mair (Edinburgh University), F. McLachlan (Edinburgh Wanderers),
R. A. Cadzow (Edinburgh Wanderers), H. L. McKill (Watsonians), W. S. Glen (Edinburgh Wanderers), S. T. H. Wright (Stewart's College F.P),
Douglas Elliot (Edinburgh Academicals)
South: A. D. Little (Selkirk), S. S. Cowan (Selkirk), J. Cowan (Selkirk), Robin Charters (Hawick), J. Hume (Kelso),
J. M. Maxwell (Langholm), J. Wright (Hawick), L. Hastie (Kelso), Jock King (Selkirk), Jimmie Johnston (Melrose),
J. J. Hegarty (Hawick), A. Robson (Hawick), J. Grant (Hawick). G. K. Smith (Kelso)

=== Round 2 ===
7 October 1953

South	9 – 6	Glasgow District
Try: J. Telford; J.J. Hegarty; J.M. Maxwell	Preview; Report	Try: J. L. Blackwood; Pen: Hamish Kemp

Mansfield Park, Hawick
Referee: J.A.S. Taylor (Musselburgh)

South: R. Chisholm (Melrose), W. R. Scott (Hawick), S. S. Cowan (Selkirk), Les Allan (Melrose), R. W. Notman (Jedforest),
J. M. Maxwell (Langholm), J. Wright (Hawick), Bob Wilson (Gala) (captain), J. Telford (Langholm), Jim Inglis (Selkirk), J. J. Hegarty (Hawick),
Jimmie Johnston (Melrose), A. Robson (Hawick), D. M. Brown (Melrose), G. K. Smith (Kelso)
Glasgow District: D. McIntyre (Glasgow HSFP), R. D. Unkles (Glasgow HSFP), Allan Cameron (Hillhead High School F.P.) (captain), Donald Cameron (Glasgow HSFP), G. N. McKenzie (Greenock Wanderers), I. Cameron (Jordanhill School F.P.), A.A.W. Waddell (Glasgow Academicals), R. A. Brechin (Glasgow Academicals), J. Cassells (Greenock Wanderers), J. C. Dawson (Glasgow Academicals), Hamish Kemp (Glasgow HSFP), A. Gilchrist (West of Scotland), J. D. Rollo (Glasgow HSFP), Percy Friebe (Glasgow HSFP), J. L. Blackwood (Glasgow Academicals)

=== Round 3 ===
24 October 1953

North	15 – 39	Edinburgh District
Try: E. H. Cruickhank; J. R. Andrew; Pen: E. H. Cruickhank x 2 Dallas Allardice	Preview; Report	Try: I. W. Nicholl x 2 L. B. Mackenzie x 2 Jim Davidson x 2 J. S. Glen x 2 Con: Norman Mair x 6 Pen: Norman Mair

North Inch, Perth
Referee: R. G. Nicolson (Gala)

North: W. Thomson (St. Andrews University), E. H. Cruickshank (Aberdeen GSFP), P. G. Younie (Aberdeen Wanderers), A. R. Pate (Highland),
D. J. McPherson (Gordonians), J. M. Anderson (St. Andrews University), W. D. Allerdice (Aberdeen GSFP) (captain), A. A. Tullett (Gordonians),
A. S. Hay (Perthshire Academicals), F. H. More (Perthshire Academicals), C. D. Mowat (Aberdeen GSFP), J. R. Andrew (Harris F.P.),
J. Greenwood (Dunfermline), K. J. Donaldson (Perthshire Academicals), J. K. Mearns (Panmure)
Edinburgh District: D. H. Crighton (Royal HSFP), I. W. Nicoll (Royal HSFP), L. B. Mackenzie (Royal HSFP), G. T. Ross (Watsonians), Grant Weatherstone (Stewart's College FP), Jim Davidson (Edinburgh University), G. S. Morgan (Melville F. P.), T. A. Herdman (Melville F. P.),
Norman Mair (Edinburgh University), F. McLachlan (Edinburgh Wanderers), R. A. Cadzow (Edinburgh Wanderers), H. L. McKill (Watsonians),
W. S. Glen (Edinburgh Wanderers), S. T. H. Wright (Stewart's F. P.), Douglas Elliot (Edinburgh Academicals) (captain)

=== Round 4 ===
31 October 1953

Glasgow District	22 – 5	North
Try: Allan Cameron; A. A. W. Waddell; A. S. Headrick; Con: Hamish Kemp; Angus Cameron; Pen: Angus Cameron; Drop: A. A. W. Waddell; Angus Cameron	Preview; Report	Try: C. D. Mowat; Con: W. D. Allardice

Old Anniesland
Referee: W.C.W. Murdoch (Hillhead HSFP)

Glasgow District: Angus Cameron (Glasgow HSFP), A. M. Smith (Glasgow University), Allan Cameron (Hillhead HSFP),
A. S. Headrick (Glasgow Academicals), A. G. Campbell (Kelvinside Academicals), Donald Cameron (Glasgow HSFP),
A. A. W. Waddell (Glasgow Academicals), F. I. Hogarth (West of Scotland), J. Cassells (Greenock Wanderers),
J.C. Dewar (Glasgow Academicals), Hamish Kemp (Glasgow HSFP), I. A. A. McGregor (Hillhead HSFP), J. D. Rollo (Glasgow HSFP),
M. Chisholm (Glasgow HSFP), R. C. Taylor (Kelvinside Academicals) (captain)
North: W. Thomson (St. Andrews University), K. M. Cruickshank (Aberdeen GSFP), P. J. Younie (Aberdeen Wanderers),
J. H. Meldrum (Kirkcaldy), D. J. McPherson (Gordonians), A. R. Pate (Highland), W. D. Allardice (Aberdeen GSFP), (captain), A. A. Tullet (Gordonians), C. W. Bravin (Dunfermline), F. H. Moore (Perthshire Academicals),
C. D. Mowat (Aberdeen GSFP), D. N. Georgeson (Aberdeen GSFP), J. Greenwood (Dunfermline), K. J. Donaldson (Perthshire Academicals),
A. I. Cheyne (Aberdeen University)

=== Round 5 ===
14 November 1953

North	8 – 27	South
Try: D. J. McPherson; J. Greenwood; Con: W. D. Allardice	Preview; Report	Try: Robin Charters x 2 R. B. Notman; J. M. Maxwell; Les Allan; A. F. Dorward; Con: Les Allan x 3 Pen: Les Allan

University Park, St. Andrews
Referee: R.M. Morrison (Watsonians)

North: W. Thomson (St. Andrews University) (captain), E. H. Cruickshank (Aberdeen GSFP), P. J. Younie (Aberdeen Wanderers),
A. M. Nicoll (Harris Academy F. P), D. J. McPherson (Gordonians), F. J. Whitehurst (St. Andrews University), W. D. Allardice (Aberdeen GSFP),
A. A. Tullett (Gordonians), C. W. Bravin (Dunfermline), F. H. Moore (Perthshire Academicals), C. D. Mowat (Aberdeen GSFP),
D. N. Georgeson (Aberdeen GSFP), J. Greenwood (Dunfermline), Ernie Michie (Aberdeen University), J. K. Mearns (Panmure)
South: J. R. McCredie (Hawick), R. B. Notman (Jedforest), Robin Charters (Hawick), Les Allan (Melrose) (captain), S. S. Cowan (Selkirk), J. M. Maxwell (Langholm), A. F. Dorward (Gala), H. McLeod (Hawick), Jock King (Selkirk), Jim Inglis (Selkirk), J. J. Hegarty (Hawick), T. Elliot (Gala), A. Robson (Hawick), D. M. Brown (Melrose), G. K. Smith (Kelso)

=== Round 6 ===
12 December 1953

Glasgow District	0 – 6	Edinburgh District
	1st Preview; Postponement; 2nd Preview; Report	Try: T. P. L. McGlashan; G. T. Ross

Old Anniesland
Referee: A. L. Dickie (Gala)

Glasgow District: Angus Cameron (Glasgow HSFP), A. G. Campbell (Kelvinside Academicals), Donald Cameron (Glasgow HSFP),
Allan Cameron (Hillhead HSFP), T. E. S. Ferguson (Hillhead HSFP), J. A. Ferguson (Hillhead HSFP) (captain),
A. A. W. Waddell (Glasgow Academicals), J. D. Rollo (Glasgow HSFP), J. Cassells (Greenock Wanderers), J. C. Dawson (Glasgow Academicals), Hamish Kemp (Glasgow HSFP), W. F. Morton (West of Scotland), Percy Friebe (Glasgow HSFP), J. L. Blackwood (Glasgow Academicals)
Edinburgh District: D. H. Crighton (Watsonians), Grant Weatherstone (Stewart's College FP), K. R. McDonald (Stewart's College FP),
Jim Davidson (Edinburgh University), Donald Scott (Watsonians), G. T. Ross (Watsonians), J. R. Glen (Edinburgh Wanderers),
T. P. L. McGlashan (Royal High School F.P), Norman Mair (Edinburgh University), F. McLachlan (Edinburgh Wanderers),
H. L. McKill (Watsonians), R. A. Cadzow (Edinburgh Wanderers), J. S. Ure (Edinburgh Wanderers), S. T. H. Wright (Stewart's College FP),
Douglas Elliot (Edinburgh Academicals) (captain)

== Outwith the Championship ==
7 April 1954

Renfrewshire	–	Ayrshire
	Preview

Penilee

Renfrewshire:
Ayrshire:
