= Madras College FP RFC =

Scottish rugby union club, based in St Andrews, Fife

(Scotland) Madras College FP
- Full name: Madras College Former Pupils Rugby Football Club
- Founded: 1866; 160 years ago
- Location: St Andrews, Scotland
- Ground: Station Park
- President: Ben Stuart
- League: Caledonia Midlands Division Two
- 2024–25: Caledonia Midlands Division Two, 3rd of 9
Team kit

Official website
- www.madrasrugby.co.uk

Madras College Former Pupils Rugby Football Club is a rugby union side based in St Andrews in Fife, Scotland. They play in Caledonia Regional League Division 2. They play at Station Park, St Andrews and field two men's fifteens each weekend, as well as a women's team (AKA The Saints).

The club has close ties with Madras College, a secondary school in St Andrews. Although not all players are former pupils of the school, many are and sixth year pupils often train and play with the club during holidays and weeks in which school rugby is not on.

The good facilities of the rugby club and St Andrews in general attract many bigger teams such as the Scottish national side and Heriot's Rugby Club to train there during pre-season.

== History ==
St Andrews has been instrumental in the development of rugby in Scotland. Rugby was introduced to St Andrews University in 1858 as a means of interesting the Scottish gentry away from the great English universities and to study in Scotland. Scotland's oldest club is Edinburgh Academicals, established in 1857, which shows that rugby in St Andrews was not far behind. In 1871, JH Oatts, a former pupil of Madras College, amongst colleagues, issued an invite to the English to come to Edinburgh and play the first international fixture of the 'carrying game' on 27 March . This invite came after a 10-year run of defeats at football at the hands of the English. 2 players from St Andrews featured in this 20-a-side game, which the Scots won.

Representatives from the four great clubs, Glasgow Academicals, Edinburgh Academical Football Club, West of Scotland and University of St Andrews RFC, then formed the Scottish Rugby Union in 1873, and the game was reduced to 15-a-side soon after. St Andrews built up a strong reputation for its backs-play, which was very different from the typical forwards-led style of the day.

Madras play the St. Andrews University side in a derby match annually for the Drummond Cup.

== Notable players ==
=== Scotland ===
The following former Madras College F.P. players have represented Scotland at international level.

- (Scotland) Rob Dewey
- (Scotland) Jamie Ritchie
- (Scotland) Alex Samuel

=== North and Midlands ===
The following former Madras College F.P. players have represented North and Midlands at provincial level.

- (Scotland) J. B. Dobie
- (Scotland) R. A. M. Scott
- (Scotland) L. F. Hunter
- (Scotland) Ally Fraser

=== North of Scotland ===
The following former Madras College F.P. players have represented North of Scotland at provincial level.

- (Scotland) Jock Steven

=== Glasgow Warriors ===
The following former Madras College F.P. players have represented Glasgow Warriors at professional level.

- (Scotland) Rob Dewey
- (Scotland) Alex Samuel

== Honours ==
- Waid Academy F.P. Sevens
  - Champions: 1961, 1962, 1963, 1964, 1980, 1988, 1990
- Kirkcaldy Sevens
  - Champions: 1961
