= Jimmy McNeil =

Scottish rugby union player

- Born: Jimmy T. McNeil
- Died: c. June 2003
- School: Hutchesons' Grammar School

Rugby union career
Amateur team(s)
Years	Team	Apps	(Points)
- Hutchesons' GSFP
Provincial / State sides
Years	Team	Apps	(Points)
- Glasgow District

103rd President of the Scottish Rugby Union
- In office 1989–1990
- Preceded by: Tom Pearson
- Succeeded by: Charlie Stewart

Jimmy McNeil was a Scottish rugby union player. He became the 103rd President of the Scottish Rugby Union.

== Rugby Union career ==
=== Amateur career ===
He played for Hutchesons' GSFP.

=== Provincial career ===
He played for Glasgow District.

=== Administrative career ===
McNeil was a President of Hutchesons' GSFP. His declared neutrality on the proposed merger with Old Aloysians allowed the clubs to merge to become Hutchesons Aloysians in 1990.

He was a Chairman of Glasgow District.

He became the 103rd President of the Scottish Rugby Union. He served the standard one year from 1989 to 1990.

He caused controversy when he and the Vice-President Gordon Masson attended the 1989 centenary celebrations of South African rugby.

McNeil also made the headlines by calling out derogatory language among rugby union fans. He said that some fans were using 'degrading and foul language' and that there was a 'changing climate' in which matches were being played.

He was President when Scotland won a Grand Slam in 1990. In The Grudge Tom English relays an anecdote when Scotland beat Ireland in Dublin en route to securing the title. McNeil went in to the victorious Scotland dressing room after the match - evidently not paying attention to the match as he had been at the bar - and said: 'Bad luck men. You'll get them next time'.

He went on the 1990 tour to New Zealand.
