= 1954 Five Nations Championship =

Rugby union competition

- Date: 9 January - 10 April 1954
- Countries: England; Ireland; France; Scotland; Wales

Tournament statistics
- Champions: England, France and Wales
- Triple Crown: England (12th title)
- Matches played: 10

The 1954 Five Nations Championship was the twenty-fifth series of the rugby union Five Nations Championship. Including the previous incarnations as the Home Nations and Five Nations, this was the sixtieth series of the northern hemisphere rugby union championship. Ten matches were played between 9 January and 10 April. It was contested by England, France, Ireland, Scotland and Wales. Wales, England and France shared the championship; this marked France's first title. England won the Triple Crown and the Calcutta Cup.

England missed out on a seventh Grand Slam after losing to France at Stade Colombes.

== Participants ==
The teams involved were:

Nation	Venue	City	Captain
England	Twickenham	London	Bob Stirling
France	Stade Olympique Yves-du-Manoir	Colombes	Jean Prat
Ireland	Lansdowne Road/Ravenhill	Dublin/Belfast	Jackie Kyle/Jim McCarthy
Scotland	Murrayfield	Edinburgh	Norman Davidson/Doug Elliot
Wales	National Stadium/St Helen's	Cardiff/Swansea	Ken Jones/Rees Stephens/Rex Willis

== Table ==
Pos	Team	Pld	W	D	L	PF	PA	PD	Pts
1	Wales	4	3	0	1	52	34	+18	6
1	England	4	3	0	1	39	23	+16	6
1	France	4	3	0	1	35	22	+13	6
4	Ireland	4	1	0	3	18	34	−16	2
5	Scotland	4	0	0	4	6	37	−31	0

== Results ==
1954-01-09

Scotland	0–3	France

Edinburgh

1954-01-16

England	9–6	Wales

London

1954-01-23

France	8–0	Ireland

Paris

1954-02-13

England	14–3	Ireland

London

1954-02-27

Ireland	6–0	Scotland

Belfast

This was the last Ireland international played at Ravenhill until 2007. Players from the Republic of Ireland threatened not to line out for the UK anthem unless their anthem and flag were also used. The IRFU resolved the issue by moving all future home matches to Dublin.

1954-03-13

Ireland	9–12	Wales

Dublin

1954-03-20

Scotland	3–13	England

Edinburgh

1954-03-27

Wales	19–13	France

Cardiff

1954-04-10

France	11–3	England

Paris

1954-04-10

Wales	15–3	Scotland

Swansea
