= 1951–52 Scottish Districts season =

Rugby union competition

- Countries: Scotland
- Date: 1951–52
- Matches played: 1

The 1951–52 Scottish Districts season is a record of all the rugby union matches for Scotland's district teams.

== History ==
Glasgow District beat Edinburgh District in the Inter-City match.

This season's dates included a touring South Africa side.

== Results ==
Date	Try	Conversion	Penalty	Dropped goal	Goal from mark	Notes
1948–1970	3 points	2 points	3 points	3 points	3 points	

=== Inter-City ===
1 December 1951

Glasgow District	6 - 3	Edinburgh District
	Report

Old Anniesland, Glasgow

Glasgow District:
Edinburgh District:

=== Other Scottish matches ===
3 November 1951

Midlands District	6 - 0	North of Scotland District

Midlands District:
North of Scotland District:

3 November 1951

Glasgow District	21 - 6	Rest of the West

Glasgow District:
Rest of the West:

3 November 1951

Edinburgh District	14 - 0	South of Scotland District
	Preview

Edinburgh District:
South of Scotland District:

10 November 1951

South of Scotland District	18 - 0	North of Scotland District
	Report

Netherdale, Galasheils
Referee: Adam Austin (Glasgow HSFP)

South of Scotland District:
North of Scotland District:

17 November 1951

West of Scotland District	14 - 6	East of Scotland District

West of Scotland District:
East of Scotland District:

1 December 1951

Highlands	-	Glasgow District
	Preview

Inverness

Highlands:
Glasgow District:

=== English matches ===
10 October 1951

Durham County	9 - 14	South of Scotland District
	Report

Durham

Durham County:
South of Scotland District:

=== Trial matches ===
15 December 1951

Blues Trial	5 - 14	Whites Trial
	Report

Murrayfield Stadium
Referee: W.C.W. Murdoch (Hillhead HSFP)

Blues Trial:
Whites Trial:

29 December 1951

Blues Trial	10 - 11	Whites Trial
	Report

Murrayfield Stadium
Referee: Donny Innes (Aberdeen GSFP)

Blues Trial:
Whites Trial:

=== International matches ===
31 October 1951

Cities District	11 - 43	South Africa

Cities District:
South Africa:

28 November 1951

North of Scotland District	3 - 14	South Africa

North of Scotland District:
South Africa:

19 January 1951

South of Scotland District	3 - 13	South Africa

South of Scotland District:
South Africa:
