= 1964–65 Scottish Inter-District Championship =

Rugby union competition

- Countries: Scotland
- Date: 1964–65
- Champions: South / Glasgow District
- Runners-up: North and Midlands
- Matches played: 6

The 1964–65 Scottish Inter-District Championship was a rugby union competition for Scotland's district teams.

This season saw the 12th Scottish Inter-District Championship.

South and Glasgow District shared the competition with 2 wins.

== 1964-65 League Table ==
Team	P	W	D	L	PF	PA	+/-	Pts
South	3	2	0	1	32	23	+9	4
Glasgow District	3	2	0	1	25	18	+7	4
North and Midlands	3	1	0	2	29	37	-8	2
Edinburgh District	3	1	0	2	25	33	-8	2

== Results ==
Date	Try	Conversion	Penalty	Dropped goal	Goal from mark	Notes
1948–1970	3 points	2 points	3 points	3 points	3 points	

=== Round 1 ===
27 October 1964

South	3 – 8	Glasgow District
Try: P. Robertson	Preview; Report	Try: A. I. Hardie; Con: W. A. Burnet; Pen: G. M. Simmers

Poynder Park, Kelso
Referee: D. C. J. McMahon (Heriots F. P.)

South: J. H. Gray (Hawick), C. Elliot (Langholm), R. Welsh (Hawick), P. B. Townsend (Gala), M. Fairbairn (Melrose), J. Turner (Gala),
A. J. Hastie (Melrose), N. Suddon (Hawick), F. A. L. Laidlaw (Melrose), P. Robertson (Hawick), W. J. Hunter (Hawick), R. W. Brydon (Hawick),
Tommy Elliot (Langholm), J. W. Telfer (Melrose), A. A. Carson (Gala)
Glasgow District: J. H. Roxburgh (Jordanhill RFC), R. A. Speedman (Glasgow University), W. A. Burnet (West of Scotland),
G. M. Simmers (Glasgow Academicals), A. I. Hardie (Glasgow Academicals), B. M. Simmers (Glasgow Academicals),
Dick Allan (Hutcheson's GSFP), J. McLaughlan (Jordanhill RFC), J. M. Kerr (Hutcheson's GSFP), I. V. Douglas (Hillhead HSFP),
A. B. Carmichael (West of Scotland), C. S. Bisset (Jordanhill RFC), J. Buchanan (Jordanhill RFC), J. C. Mackenzie (Hillhead HSFP),
W. S. Unkles (Glasgow HSFP)

== Matches outwith the Championship ==
24 October 1964

North of Scotland District	–	Midlands District
	Preview; Report

Linksfield Stadium, Aberdeen

North of Scotland District:
Midlands District:

8 April 1965

Glasgow District	–	Glasgow Select
	Preview

Auldhouse

Glasgow District:
Glasgow Select:
