= Jock Steven =

Scottish rugby union player (1935–2020)

- Born: John Brown Steven; 10 May 1935 St Andrews, Scotland
- Died: 6 April 2020 (aged 84)
- School: Madras College

Rugby union career
- Position: Flanker
Amateur team(s)
Years	Team	Apps	(Points)
-	Madras College FP		
Provincial / State sides
Years	Team	Apps	(Points)
1964	North of Scotland District		
International career
Years	Team	Apps	(Points)
1962	Barbarians		
Coaching career
- Years: Team
- -: Madras College FP
- –: North of Scotland District
- –: Scotland U18

107th President of the Scottish Rugby Union
- In office 1993–1994
- Preceded by: Robin Charters
- Succeeded by: Ken Smith

John Brown Steven (10 May 1935 – 6 April 2020), known as Jock Steven, was a Scottish rugby union player. He was the 107th President of the Scottish Rugby Union.

== Rugby Union career ==
=== Amateur career ===
Steven was educated at Madras College and played rugby union for the school team. His family farmed at Dunino on the East Neuk of Fife.

On leaving school, he played for Madras College FP and captained the side in 1958-59 season and 1961-62 season.

=== Provincial career ===
Steven represented the combined North of Scotland District side in their 1964 match against New Zealand.

=== International career ===
Steven's closest time to being capped for Scotland was when he was an unused travelling reserve for the international side in a Five Nations match. He was not used.

He did play for the Barbarians in their 1962 tour of Wales.

=== Coaching career ===
He coached Madras College FP and the combined North of Scotland District side. He later coached the Scotland U18 team.

=== Administrative career ===
Steven was the Madras College FP president from 1970 to 1975.

He joined the SRU as Midlands District representative in 1976.

He was tour manager of the Scotland Development XV in their 1988 tour of Zimbabwe.

Steven became the 107th President of the Scottish Rugby Union. He served the standard one year from 1993 to 1994.

== Family ==
Steven had 3 brothers:- Bill, Alan and Robert. In one memorable game in 1957 all 4 brothers, including Jock, made the Madras College FP first XV.
