= Ronald Cumming =

Scotland international rugby union player (1900–1982)

- Born: Ronald Stuart Cumming; 4 April 1900 Aberlour, Scotland
- Died: 17 November 1982 (aged 82) Rothes, Scotland

Rugby union career
- Position: Prop
Amateur team(s)
Years	Team	Apps	(Points)
-	Aberdeen University		
Provincial / State sides
Years	Team	Apps	(Points)
-	North of Scotland District		
International career
Years	Team	Apps	(Points)
1921	Scotland	2	(0)

Ronald Cumming (4 April 1900 – 17 November 1982) was a Scotland international rugby union player.

== Rugby Union career ==
=== Amateur career ===
Cumming played for Aberdeen University.

=== Provincial career ===
He played for North of Scotland District.

=== International career ===
He played for Scotland twice in 1922.

== Business career ==
He followed into the family business in the whisky industry. He became Chairman of the Scottish Whisky Association in 1961. He became Chairman of Distillers Company Ltd. in 1963.

== Family ==
His parents were John Fleetwood Cumming (1863-1933) and Beatrice Gordon Bryson Kynoch (1865-1906). John Fleetwood Cumming was a Moray councillor and owner of the Cardhu distillery near Knockando, which was founded by his grandfather in 1824. They had 2 sons Lewis Robertson Cumming (1892-1914), John Kynoch Cumming (1896-1927) and 1 daughter Elizabeth Cumming (1898-1989) as well as Ronald. His father remarried Isobel Field when Beatrice died, they had a daughter in 1909 that died in infancy. Lewis joined the Black Watch and died in the Great War; John was wounded and taken prisoner.

Ronald married Mary Hendrie (1904-1990) in Wentworth, Ontario in Canada in 1925. They had 2 daughters Elizabeth Bryson Cumming (1926-2015) and Mary Stuart Cumming (1929-1990). Mary Hendrie received an O.B.E. in 1953.
