= 1897–98 Scottish Districts season =

Rugby union competition

- Countries: Scotland
- Date: 1897–98
- Matches played: 1

The 1897–98 Scottish Districts season is a record of all the rugby union matches for Scotland's district teams.

== History ==
Glasgow District beat Edinburgh District in the Inter-City match.

South of Scotland District beat North of Scotland District by 8 goals and 2 tries to nil.

An Anglo-Scots versus South of Scotland District match was supposed to be played on 25 December 1897. The teams were announced but the match was called off.

== Results ==
Date	Try	Conversion	Penalty	Dropped goal	Goal from mark	Notes
1894–1904	3 points	2 points	3 points	4 points	4 points	

=== Inter-City ===
4 December 1897

Glasgow District	6 - 5	Edinburgh District
	Report

Hamilton Crescent, Glasgow
Referee: Adam Turnbull (Hawick)

Glasgow District:
Edinburgh District:

=== Other Scottish matches ===
11 December 1897

North of Scotland District	0 - 46	South of Scotland District
	Report

Carolina Port, Dundee

North of Scotland:
South of Scotland:

=== English matches ===
No other District matches played.

=== International matches ===
No touring matches this season.
