= Donny Innes =

Scotland international rugby union player

- Born: John Robert Stephen Innes; 16 September 1917 Aberdeen, Scotland
- Died: 21 January 2012 (aged 94) Aberdeen, Scotland
- University: University of Aberdeen

Rugby union career
- Position: Centre
Amateur team(s)
| Years | Team | Apps | (Points) |
- Aberdeen University
| – | Aberdeen GSFP | | |
| – | Co-Optimists | | |
| – | Aberdeen Nomads | | |
Provincial / State sides
| Years | Team | Apps | (Points) |
- North of Scotland District
| - | Scotland Probables | | |
International career
| Years | Team | Apps | (Points) |
| 1939-48 | Scotland | 8 | (3) |
Refereeing career
| Years | Competition | | Apps |
| 1951–52 | Scottish Districts | | 1 |

87th President of the Scottish Rugby Union
- In office 1973–1974
- Preceded by: Alfred Wilson
- Succeeded by: Charlie Drummond

Donny Innes (16 September 1917 – 21 January 2012) was a Scotland international rugby union player and a doctor who worked as a general practitioner (GP).

== Early life ==
Innes was born on 16 September 1917 in Aberdeen Scotland. His father was a physician and his mother a GP.

== Rugby Union career ==
=== Amateur career ===
While studying medicine at the University of Aberdeen, he played for the Aberdeen University rugby union side. His pre-war Scotland caps came with the university side.

He played for Aberdeen GSFP.

He was a notable rugby sevens player and led the Co-Optimists to victory in the Murrayfield Sevens tournament in 1939. He played sevens with Aberdeen Nomads that same year.

=== Provincial career ===
He was capped for the combined North of Scotland District side in 1935 while only a teenager, playing against a touring New Zealand side.

He was capped for the standalone North of Scotland District He scored a try against Midlands District in 1947.

He made the Scotland Probables side in December 1947.

=== International career ===
He was capped 8 times for Scotland. He was one of only 5 Scotland internationalists who played before and after the second World War.

He also played in 5 services International matches during the war; and the Victory international against England at Twickenham in 1946.

=== Refereeing career ===
He refereed the Blues Trial match against Whites Trial in the 1951–52 season.

=== Administrative career ===
He was on the committee of North and Midlands. He was the Scottish Rugby Union president from 1973–74. He became the Aberdeen GSFP president in 1991.

== Military career ==
He was commissioned into the Royal Army Medical Corps as an officer. He saw active service with the 155 and 156 Field Ambulance companies attached to the 52 Lowland Division. When the war finished he was at the rank of Major.

He continued with the military after the war in the Territorial Army.

== Medical career ==
Innes completed his medical training as a doctor in 1940. He completed his residency at Woodend and Foresterhill Hospitals. He became a GP after the war at a practice in Rubislaw Terrace. He became a medical officer for HM Prison Craiginches in 1949 until he retired. He was present at Scotland's last execution in 1963.

Innes died in Aberdeen on 21 January 2012 at the age of 94.
