= Douglas Muir =

Douglas Muir may refer to:

- Douglas Muir (actor) (1904–1966), British actor
- Douglas N. Muir, British philatelist
- Douglas Muir (rugby union) (1925–2014), Scotland rugby union player
