= Alex Thomson (rugby union) =

Scotland international rugby union player

- Born: Alexander McNiven Thomson; 20 February 1921 Kettins, Angus, Scotland
- Died: 2010 (aged 89) Dumfries, Scotland

Rugby union career
- Position: Lock
Amateur team(s)
Years	Team	Apps	(Points)
- University of St. Andrews
Provincial / State sides
Years	Team	Apps	(Points)
- North of Scotland
International career
Years	Team	Apps	(Points)
1949	Scotland	1	(0)

Alexander McNiven Thomson (20 February 1921 – 2010) was a Scotland international rugby union player. Thomson played as a Lock.

== Rugby Union career ==
=== Amateur career ===
Thomson played for University of St. Andrews.

=== Provincial career ===
Thomson was selected for the combined North of Scotland team to play the South on 12 November 1949.

=== International career ===
He was capped for Scotland just once. He played in the Scotland v Ireland match at Murrayfield Stadium on 26 February 1949 in the Five Nations tournament.
