= 1949–50 Scottish Districts season =

Rugby union competition

- Countries: Scotland
- Date: 1949–50
- Matches played: 1

The 1949–50 Scottish Districts season is a record of all the rugby union matches for Scotland's district teams.

== History ==
Edinburgh District beat Glasgow District in the Inter-City match.

== Results ==
Date	Try	Conversion	Penalty	Dropped goal	Goal from mark	Notes
1948–1970	3 points	2 points	3 points	3 points	3 points	

=== Inter-City ===
3 December 1949

Glasgow District	0 - 8	Edinburgh District
	Report

Old Anniesland, Glasgow

Glasgow District:
Edinburgh District:

=== Other Scottish matches ===
5 November 1949

Midlands District	-	North of Scotland District

Midlands District:
North of Scotland District:

5 November 1949

Rest of the West	-	Glasgow District

Rest of the West:
Glasgow District:

12 November 1949

North of Scotland District	-	South of Scotland District

North of Scotland District:
South of Scotland District:

=== Junior matches ===
5 November 1949

Edinburgh District	-	South of Scotland District

Edinburgh District:
South of Scotland District:

5 November 1949

West of Scotland District	-	East of Scotland District

West of Scotland District:
East of Scotland District:

=== Trial matches ===
17 December 1949

Blues Trial	-	Whites Trial

Blues Trial:
Whites Trial:

7 January 1950

Scotland Probables	-	Scotland Possibles

Probables:
Possibles:

=== English matches ===
28 September 1949

Northumberland	-	Edinburgh District
	Preview

Gosforth

Northumberland:
Edinburgh District:

20 April 1950
6.15pm

South of Scotland District	-	Cumberland and Westmorland
	Preview

Milntown, Langholm

South of Scotland District:
Cumberland and Westmorland:

=== International matches ===
No touring matches this season.
