= Tony Peart =

England international rugby union player

- Full name: Thomas George Hunter Peart
- Born: 10 September 1936 Hartlepool, England
- Died: 3 August 1988 (aged 51) Darlington, England
- School: Sedbergh School

Rugby union career
- Position: No. 8
International career
Years	Team	Apps	(Points)
1964	England	2	(0)

Thomas George Hunter "Tony" Peart (10 September 1936 – 3 August 1988) was an English rugby union player.

Peart was born in Hartlepool and educated at Sedbergh School. He enlisted in the army after school and served in Egypt during the Suez Crisis. His sister Eileen was married to Scottish rugby player Douglas Elliot.

A number eight, Peart spent most of his career with the Hartlepool Rovers, which he led for two seasons, while putting together 39 county appearances for Durham. He was capped twice for England, playing away matches against France and Scotland in the 1964 Five Nations Championship.

Peart died of cancer in 1988 at the age of 51.

== See also ==
- List of England national rugby union players
