= Hamish Scott =

Hamish Scott may refer to:

- Hamish Scott (rugby union)
- Hamish Scott (historian)
