= Adam Austin =

Adam Austin may refer to:

- A pseudonym for the American comic book artist, Gene Colan (1926–2011)
- Adam Austin (referee) (1911–1970), Scottish rugby union international referee
