= Roger Davidson (rugby union) =

Scotland international rugby union player

- Born: Roger Stewart Davidson; 17 February 1869 Kinfauns, Perth and Kinross, Scotland
- Died: 18 February 1955 (aged 86) Perth, Scotland
- University: University of Aberdeen

Rugby union career
- Position: Forward
Amateur team(s)
Years	Team	Apps	(Points)
1890	Perthshire		
1892-94	Aberdeen Nomads		
1893	Royal HSFP		
Provincial / State sides
Years	Team	Apps	(Points)
1892	North of Scotland District		
1893	East of Scotland District		
International career
Years	Team	Apps	(Points)
1893	Scotland	1	(0)
Refereeing career
Years	Competition		Apps
1896	Scottish Districts		

29th President of the Scottish Rugby Union
- In office 1902–1903
- Preceded by: George Neilson
- Succeeded by: Robert Greig

Roger Davidson was a Scotland international rugby union player. His regular playing position was Forward

== Rugby Union career ==
=== Amateur career ===
Davidson started by playing for Perthshire.

Davidson moved to Aberdeen to study at university. In 1892, Davidson was playing for Aberdeen Nomads.

Davidson played for Royal HSFP when he was capped for Scotland. He was playing for them in March 1893 but it was remarked that he was just 'helping out' the side.

=== Provincial career ===
Davidson was selected for Edinburgh District to play against North of Scotland District on 12 December 1891, but the match was called off due to frost.

Davidson did play in the North of Scotland District match against Midlands District on 26 November 1892. The Scottish Referee noted that Davidson and Trotter were conspicuous in the match for the North side, between them securing a try.

In the other direction, Davidson was selected for North of Scotland District to play against Edinburgh District on 10 December 1892, but the match was called off due to snow. He was again selected for North of Scotland District to play against South of Scotland District on 14 January 1893 but again this match was also called off.

Davidson played for East of Scotland District in their match against West of Scotland District on 21 January 1893.

=== International career ===
Davidson was capped once for Scotland in 1893.

=== Referee career ===
Davidson refereed a North of Scotland District versus Edinburgh Wanderers match on 21 March 1896.

Davidson was a linesman, or touch judge or assistant referee, for the Cities versus Provinces match of January 1899.

Davidson was also a touch-judge in the international Scotland v Ireland match in 1903, and in the Scotland v England match that same year.

=== Administrative career ===
Davidson was elected a North of Scotland District representative on the board of the Scottish Rugby Union in October 1898.

Davidson sent his apologies to the North of Scotland District when they organised a dinner to celebrate Mr. John M. Fyfe, their secretary, on 18 February 1899.

Davidson was elected President of Perthshire in 1901.

Davidson was made Honorary Vice-President of Perthshire in 1902.

Davidson was the 29th President of the Scottish Rugby Union. He served the 1902–1903 term in office.

== Outside of rugby ==
Davidson became a Minister of the Church of Scotland. He took over at Kinfauns Parish Church on his father's death - his father, C. S. Davidson, was also a Minister - and left Aberdeen in 1894. All of Davidson's ministry was at Kinfauns with the exception of two years when he was assistant at Aberdeen St. Nicholas. He did join the Territorial Army and was a chaplain there for 25 years.

Davidson announced his intention to retire as a minister at the start of February 1955. That month, he died a day after his birthday at Burghmuir Hospital in Perth, after being taken ill a few days before. He was able to talk to visiting friends who arrived for his birthday.
