= Ken Dalgleish =

Scotland international rugby union player

- Born: Kenneth James Dalgleish; 7 June 1931 Myanmar
- Died: 7 April 1974 (aged 42) Texas, United States
- University: Cambridge University

Rugby union career
- Position: Wing
Amateur team(s)
Years	Team	Apps	(Points)
-	Edinburgh Wanderers		
–	Cambridge University		
–	Panmure		
Provincial / State sides
Years	Team	Apps	(Points)
-	Edinburgh District		
International career
Years	Team	Apps	(Points)
1951-53	Scotland	4	(0)

Ken Dalgleish (7 June 1931 – 7 April 1974) was a Scotland international rugby union footballer, who played as a Wing.

== Rugby career ==
=== Amateur career ===
Dalgleish played for Edinburgh Wanderers. He also played rugby for Cambridge University.

He was to later play for Panmure.

=== Provincial career ===
Dalgleish played for Edinburgh District in the Scottish Inter-District Championship. He played against North and Midlands and South in the 1954-55 championship.

He played against South the following season.

=== International career ===
He was capped for Scotland 4 times between 1951 and 1953, all 4 caps in Five Nations matches.
