= Mark Sugden =

Irish rugby union player and rugby author

- Born: Mark Sugden; 11 February 1902 Leek, Staffordshire, England
- Died: 21 January 1990 (aged 87) Dartmouth, England
- University: Trinity College Dublin
- Notable relative(s): Danie Craven, cousin

Rugby union career
- Position: Scrum half
Amateur team(s)
Years	Team	Apps	(Points)
- Wanderers
–	Perthshire		
Provincial / State sides
Years	Team	Apps	(Points)
- Leinster
-	Midlands District		
-	North of Scotland		
International career
Years	Team	Apps	(Points)
1925-31	Ireland		
Coaching career
- Years: Team
- Dartmouth (President)

Mark Sugden (11 February 1902 – 21 January 1990) was an Irish rugby union player and rugby author. An outstanding scrum half in the late 1920s and early 30s, he was captain in the 1931 season when Ireland beat England for the third successive time by a margin of a single point. His main claim to fame as a player is that he is credited with developing the dummy pass. He also played cricket for Ireland.

== Rugby Union career ==
=== Amateur career ===
Mark Sugden was born 11 February 1902 in Leek, Staffordshire, England, son of Frederick Sugden, silk merchant, from Staffordshire, and Frances Grace Sugden from London. Sugden was brought to Dublin at the age of four when his father retired to Westminster Road, Foxrock, and went to preparatory school at Earlsfort House before attending Denstone College, Staffordshire.

He subsequently returned to Ireland to attend TCD. Sugden played rugby and cricket for Trinity, graduating BA (1926).

Sugden also played rugby for Wanderers.

He moved to Scotland to teach at Glenalmond College. While he was there he played for Perthshire.

=== Provincial career ===
Sugden played rugby for Leinster. Initially a rather average centre, his career blossomed when he was switched to scrum-half, a position in which he excelled.

On moving to Scotland he played for Midlands District.

He also played for the North of Scotland in a match against New South Wales Waratahs. The Waratahs were the de facto Australian national side at the time and the Australian Rugby Union have since decreed that their international matches of that tour should be taken as full tests.

=== International career ===
Sugden was eligible to be selected for Ireland under the residency qualification, and he made his international rugby debut at scrum-half against France in Paris on New Year's Day 1925, scoring a try in Ireland's 9–3 victory. A draw against England and a victory against Scotland ensured that Ireland finished second in the Five Nations championship that year, their best performance since 1912. His career in the Irish team coincided with one of Ireland's most successful periods at international level; although the side won no championships or triple crowns, they did win matches with a consistency that had not been a hallmark of Irish sides of the past. Sugden went on to become one of the finest scrum-halves ever to play for Ireland, and his half-back partnership with his great friend Eugene Davy (qv) is regarded by many as the best ever seen in the green shirt. His total of twenty-eight appearances for Ireland made him the country's most capped scrum-half until that figure was exceeded in 1993. He missed only one international between his debut and his final appearance against Wales in 1931, when he was sensationally dropped in favour of his Leinster understudy, Paul Murray (qv), for the 1927 game against France. He captained Ireland in 1931, his last season.

Perhaps not surprisingly, his most memorable performances tended to be against England. In 1926 Ireland defeated England 19–15 in what was their first win over England since 1911, Sugden's elusive running setting up Denis Cussen (qv) to score two of Ireland's four tries. An 11–8 defeat to Wales that year cost Ireland a triple crown and what would have been their first grand-slam. In 1929 tries by Sugden and Paul Murray (who was now playing at out-half), gave Ireland a 6–5 victory over England – their first away victory over them since 1906 and their first ever at Twickenham – with Sugden jinking over for the winning score. In 1931 a home win over Scotland and a third consecutive victory over England set them up once again for a second triple crown opportunity in as many years, but again they were thwarted, with Wales winning 15–3 in Belfast. The previous season a defeat to the same opposition had deprived Ireland of a triple crown and the championship, a situation made all the more galling by the fact that Wales had previously lost to both England and Scotland. The Belfast defeat was to be Sugden's final international, as it was for other Irish stalwarts – Jack Arigho (qv), Jimmy Farrell, and ‘Jammie’ Clinch (qv). With their departure, the great Irish team of the late 1920s began to break up. All told, in twenty-eight internationals Sugden finished on the winning side sixteen times, lost ten games, and drew two, scoring three tries in the process; a record that would compare favourably with any other Irish player before the professional era. He would have been a certainty for the 1930 Lions tour to New Zealand but, like many other prominent players, made himself unavailable for what was to be a seven-month tour. He was, however, selected by the Barbarians, making his first appearance for them in 1925. He also played on a Scotland–Ireland selection that defeated (20–13) an England–Wales side in 1929.

There is universal agreement that Sugden was, at the very least, one of the greatest scrum-halves that ever played the game. As a converted centre, at 5 ft 11 in. (1.8 m) he was much taller than was usual for the position, and his unusually long arms helped to make him a master of the ‘dummy’ pass. He was known for the unflappable way he distributed the ball, and his unrivalled ability to read a game. His natural ability is rendered all the more extraordinary when one considers that for almost all of his international career he was not playing club football due to his work commitments. A measure of his stature is that in 1987 he and his half-back partner Eugene Davy were the inaugural members of the Irish Rugby Writers Hall of Fame. In 1926 he was a key part of a back line that many regard as the finest ever to play for Ireland, with himself and Davy at half-back, Denis Cussen and Tom Hewitt on the wings, George Stephenson (qv) and Tom Hewitt's brother Frank in the centre, and Ernie Crawford at full-back.

=== Administrative career ===
Although he lived in Dartmouth for the rest of his life, and was President of Dartmouth Rugby Club, he continued to keep a close eye on Irish rugby and regularly travelled to Ireland to watch internationals.

== Cricket career ==
He was also an accomplished cricketer, playing for TCD (1922–6), where he played in the same side as playwright Samuel Beckett (qv), and for Ireland (1924–30). He was a middle order right-handed batsman and a right-arm fast-to-medium bowler. In eight first-class matches he scored 263 runs and took six wickets. In later years he also played squash for Devon.

== Writing career ==
In 1945 Sugden co-wrote with Gerald Hollis (1919–2005) a coaching book, Rugger: do it this way.

== Teaching career ==
Sugden left Ireland shortly after graduating from TCD, spending five years teaching at Glenalmond College, Scotland. He subsequently moved to the Britannia Royal Naval College in Dartmouth, Devon, where he taught modern languages, and retired as head of department in 1974.

== Family ==
He was a distant cousin of South African rugby player and administrator Danie Craven. His wife's name was Margaret (known as ‘Hilda’) and they had two sons, Peter and Michael. In 1963 he was appointed an OBE. He died three weeks after his wife, in Dartmouth on 21 January 1990.
