= Adam Robson =

Scottish rugby union player

- Born: Adam Robson; 16 August 1928 Hawick, Scotland
- Died: 15 March 2007 (aged 78) Dollar, Scotland

Rugby union career
- Position: Flanker
Amateur team(s)
| Years | Team | Apps | (Points) |
- Edinburgh College of Art
| 1951 | Hawick Linden | | |
| – | Hawick | | |
Provincial / State sides
| Years | Team | Apps | (Points) |
| 1954 | South of Scotland District | | |
International career
| Years | Team | Apps | (Points) |
| 1954-60 | Scotland | 22 | (0) |

97th President of the Scottish Rugby Union
- In office 1983–1984
- Preceded by: George Thomson
- Succeeded by: Hamish Kemp

Adam Robson (16 August 1928 – 15 March 2007) was a Scotland international rugby union player. He played as a flanker.

== Rugby union career ==
=== Amateur career ===
He was playing for the Edinburgh College of Art. A relative Andrew Gordon suggested he play with Hawick Linden before trying to make the step up to Hawick.

Robson then played for Hawick Linden and Hawick.

=== Provincial career ===
He was capped by South of Scotland District in the 1954–55 Scottish Inter-District Championship.

=== International career ===
He was capped twenty-two times for Scotland between 1954 and 1960.

=== Administrative career ===
Robson served on the Barbarians committee for 20 years.

He became the 97th President of the Scottish Rugby Union. He served the standard one year from 1983 to 1984.

== Outside of rugby union ==
He was an art teacher at Dollar Academy. He was a prolific artist selling more than 900 works; and also authored three books.
