= Richard McKnight =

Scottish rugby union player

- Born: Richard McKnight; 20 May 1977 (age 49) Glasgow, Scotland
- Height: 5 ft 8 in (1.73 m)
- Weight: 83 kg (183 lb)
- School: Glasgow academy

Rugby union career
- Position: Scrum-Half
Amateur team(s)
Years	Team	Apps	(Points)
- Glasgow Academicals
1998	Glasgow Southern		
1999-2008	Glasgow Hawks		
2008	Glasgow Academicals		
Senior career
Years	Team	Apps	(Points)
2003-05	Glasgow Warriors		
Provincial / State sides
Years	Team	Apps	(Points)
	Glasgow District U21	2	

Richard McKnight (born in Scotland), is a former Scottish rugby union player, formerly of Glasgow Warriors and Glasgow Academy C Team. McKnight played at Scrum-Half.

== Amateur career ==
McKnight played for Glasgow Academicals, Glasgow Southern and Glasgow Hawks.

He returned to Academicals in 2008 and captained the side. As of 2024, Richard has worked for Langs.

== Professional career ==
He was with the Warriors in season 2003-04.

He was with the Warriors in season 2004-05.
