= Donald Cameron (rugby union, born 1927) =

Scotland international rugby union player

- Born: Donald Cameron; 25 December 1927 Glasgow, Scotland
- Died: 15 September 2003 (aged 75) Glasgow, Scotland
- Notable relative(s): Angus Cameron, brother Rob McAlpine, great-nephew

Rugby union career
- Position: Centre
Amateur team(s)
Years	Team	Apps	(Points)
-	Glasgow HSFP		
Provincial / State sides
Years	Team	Apps	(Points)
-	Glasgow District		
International career
Years	Team	Apps	(Points)
1953-54	Scotland	6	(0)

Donald Cameron (25 December 1927 – 15 September 2003) was a Scottish international rugby union player. He played as a Centre.

== Rugby union career ==
=== Amateur career ===
Cameron played for Glasgow HSFP.

=== Provincial career ===
Cameron played for Glasgow District. He played in the Scottish Inter-District Championship in its first season, 1953–54.

=== International career ===
He was capped for Scotland six times between 1953 and 1954.

== Family ==
His brother Angus Cameron was also capped for Scotland.
