= Charlie Stewart (rugby union) =

Scotland international rugby union player

- Born: Charles Edward Bell Stewart; 23 December 1936 Yarrow, Scottish Borders, Scotland
- Died: 29 November 1998 (aged 61) Kelso, Scotland

Rugby union career
- Position: Flanker
Amateur team(s)
Years	Team	Apps	(Points)
- Kelso
Provincial / State sides
Years	Team	Apps	(Points)
1960	South of Scotland District		
International career
Years	Team	Apps	(Points)
1960-61	Scotland	2	(0)

104th President of the Scottish Rugby Union
- In office 1990–1991
- Preceded by: Jimmy McNeil
- Succeeded by: Gordon Masson

Charlie Stewart (23 December 1936 – 29 November 1998) was a Scotland international rugby union player. He became the 104th President of the Scottish Rugby Union.

== Rugby Union career ==
=== Amateur career ===
Stewart played for Kelso.

=== Provincial career ===
He played for South of Scotland District in the 1960–61 Scottish Inter-District Championship.

=== International career ===
He played for Scotland twice from 1960 to 1961.

=== Administrative career ===
He became the 104th President of the Scottish Rugby Union. He served the standard one year from 1990 to 1991.
