= Alex Samuel (rugby union) =

Scottish rugby union player (born 2002)

- Born: Alex Samuel; 27 December 2002 (age 23) St Andrews, Scotland
- Height: 6 ft 9 in (2.06 m)
- Weight: 124 kg (273 lb; 19 st 7 lb)
- School: St Leonards School, St. Andrews

Rugby union career
- Position: Lock
Amateur team(s)
Years	Team	Apps	(Points)
- Madras College FP
Senior career
Years	Team	Apps	(Points)
2020–	Glasgow Warriors	51	(0)
Super Rugby
Years	Team	Apps	(Points)
2020-21	Stirling Wolves		
2021-	Ayrshire Bulls		
International career
Years	Team	Apps	(Points)
2021	Scotland U20		
2024	Scotland	4	(0)

Alex Samuel (born 27 December 2002) is a Scotland international rugby union player who plays for Glasgow Warriors at the Lock position.

== Rugby Union career ==
=== Amateur career ===
Samuel went to St Leonards School in St. Andrews, and then went on to Madras College. He then played for Madras College FP.

=== Professional career ===
He moved to Glasgow Warriors in 2020, initially with the Scottish Rugby Academy, before graduating from the academy with a permanent deal with the Glasgow club. Then Warriors' Head Coach Danny Wilson marked out Samuel as one to watch in a supporters event in 2020.

While at the academy he was aligned to Stirling Wolves in the Super 6.

Samuel played for the Ayrshire Bulls under Peter Horne in the Super 6 in the Fosroc Super Sprint championship.

He made his debut for Glasgow Warriors against the Ayrshire Bulls on 2 September 2022 at Inverness as a replacement.

He then made his competitive debut for the Warriors against Benetton Rugby on 28 October 2022 in the United Rugby Championship in a 6 try win. He became only the fifth teenager to make his debut playing in the second row for the club. He became Glasgow Warrior No. 346.

Because of his Warriors debut he could not play in the Super 6 final between Ayrshire Bulls and Watsonians the following day. However Samuel said of his Warriors start: "It was a bit of a dream come true. Usually I’m on the other side of the fence as a fan, have been for about the last 10 years. It’s pretty cool."

He followed that up with a start against Leinster Rugby at the RDS Arena on 26 November 2022 in the following round match.

=== International career ===
Samuel captained the Scotland U20 side in 2021.

He was invited to train with the senior Scotland squad for the 2021 Six Nations Championship. He received his first full senior cap in the Autumn International match against Portugal on 16 November 2024, becoming cap no. 1233.
