= Bob Wilson (rugby union) =

Scotland international rugby union player

- Born: Robert Little Wilson; 1 July 1926 Galashiels, Scotland
- Died: 29 March 1985 (aged 58) Edinburgh, Scotland

Rugby union career
- Position: Prop
Amateur team(s)
Years	Team	Apps	(Points)
- Gala
Provincial / State sides
Years	Team	Apps	(Points)
- South
International career
Years	Team	Apps	(Points)
1951-53	Scotland	8	(0)

Bob Wilson (1 July 1926 – 29 March 1985) was a former Scotland international rugby union player. Wilson played as a Prop.

== Rugby career ==
=== Amateur career ===
Wilson played for Gala, as well as for South of Scotland, the Barbarians, and Scotland. A was a skilled exponent of the Sevens game and a member of the Gala Sevens team that won several tournaments on the Borders Sevens circuit in the early 1950s. He also represented Gala at the Middlesex Sevens.

=== Provincial career ===
Wilson played for South.He captained the South against the All Blacks in 1953. He played in the 1953–54 Scottish Inter-District Championship - the very first Scottish Inter-District Championship - and captained the side against Glasgow District. He played for the Barbarians in the 1952 Easter Tour of Wales.

=== International career ===
He was capped for Scotland 8 times between 1951 and 1953, playing in 7 Five Nations matches and he was also capped playing against South Africa.
