= Douglas Muir (rugby union) =

Scotland international rugby union player

- Born: Douglas Edgar Muir; 17 March 1925 Edinburgh, Scotland
- Died: 6 September 2014 (aged 89) Essex, England
- School: George Heriot's School

Rugby union career
- Position: Lock
Amateur team(s)
Years	Team	Apps	(Points)
- Heriots
Provincial / State sides
Years	Team	Apps	(Points)
- Edinburgh District
International career
Years	Team	Apps	(Points)
1949	Barbarians		
1950-52	Scotland	7	(0)

Douglas Muir (17 March 1925 – 6 September 2014) was a Scotland international rugby union player who played for Heriots at amateur level and Edinburgh District at provincial level.

== Rugby career ==
=== Amateur career ===
He played for Heriots

=== Provincial career ===
Muir represented Edinburgh District. He was in the winning side that won the 1949-50 Inter-City against Glasgow District. He also played in the next two Inter-City matches, but was on the losing side in both. Although Edinburgh won the first Scottish Inter-District Championship in 1953-54 Muir did not feature in the tournament. He did play in the 1954–55 Scottish Inter-District Championship however Edinburgh finished third that season.

=== International career ===
He was capped for Scotland seven times between 1950–52, making his debut against France.

He also played for the Barbarians.

=== Scotland selector ===
On Muir's retirement in business he was to become a Scotland selector.

== Outside of rugby ==
=== Army ===
Muir served with the Gurkas in the second world war.

=== Business ===
Muir joined Edinburgh based printing and packaging firm William Thyne & Co. as a management trainee and rose to become the Managing Director. When Thyne was taken over by Mardon Packaging, he moved to Bristol as divisional chairman.

=== Family ===
His wife Isla died in 2011. Muir died in Essex while visiting his son. His normal residence was in Guernsey, where he stayed with his daughter.

His funeral took place in Guernsey.
