= Hamish Scott (rugby union) =

Scotland international rugby union player

- Born: James Stuart Scott; 17 February 1924 Edinburgh, Scotland
- Died: 12 March 2010 (aged 86) St Andrews, Scotland
- School: Madras College
- University: University of St Andrews

Rugby union career
- Position: Flanker / Number Eight
Amateur team(s)
Years	Team	Apps	(Points)
- St Andrews University
–	Blackheath		
–	Madras College FP		
Provincial / State sides
Years	Team	Apps	(Points)
- North of Scotland
-	North Malaya		
International career
Years	Team	Apps	(Points)
1950	Scotland	1	(0)

Hamish Scott (17 February 1924 – 12 March 2010) was a Scotland international rugby union footballer. He played at Flanker and Number Eight.

== Rugby career ==
=== Amateur career ===
Born in Edinburgh, Scott was raised in St Andrews and attended the University of St Andrews, where he studied geology.

Scott played for St Andrews University rugby club

He briefly played for Blackheath in London before moving to Asia.

He later completed his PhD in parasitology at University of St Andrews when he then played for Madras College F.P.

=== Provincial career ===
Scott played for North of Scotland.

Whilst in Malaya he played for North Malaya at rugby.

=== International career ===
He was capped for Scotland once in 1950, playing in the Five Nations match against England at Murrayfield Stadium on 18 March 1950. Scotland won the match 13 - 11.

He was capped at Number Eight.

== Outside of rugby ==
He served in the Royal Navy during the Second World War aboard HMS Scorpion and was involved in escorting duties for the Russian convoy ships in the Arctic Ocean. His navy career took him to the Pacific and he served in Australia.

In 1949 he was the official photographer for a Himalayan expedition in Nepal which saw the first ascent of Paldor and the discovery of the Tilman Pass. The expedition included Norgay Tensing and was led by Bill Tilman,

He took up a post in Malaya with the colonial government as a Marine Biologist, and wrote a book on the fish off the Malaysian coast.

He was to later move to Nigeria, then Canada; where he stayed in St. Andrews, New Brunswick. He died in 2010, at Scotland's St Andrews on a visit home to Fife.
