= Ernie Michie =

British Lions & Scotland international rugby union player (1933–2021)

- Born: Ernest James Stewart Michie; 7 November 1933 Aberdeen, Scotland
- Died: 13 November 2021 (aged 88)
- Weight: 89 kg (14 st 0 lb)

Rugby union career
- Position: Lock
Amateur team(s)
| Years | Team | Apps | (Points) |
- Aberdeen University
| – | Aberdeen GSFP | | |
| – | Army | | |
| – | Langholm | | |
| – | London Scottish | | |
| – | Leicester Tigers | | |
Provincial / State sides
| Years | Team | Apps | (Points) |
- North
| - | North and Midlands | | |
International career
| Years | Team | Apps | (Points) |
| 1948-56 | Scotland | 17 | (18) |
| 1955 | British and Irish Lions | 2 | (11) |
| – | Barbarians | | |

Ernest James Stewart Michie (7 November 1933 – 13 November 2021) was a Scottish international rugby union player, who played for Scotland and the Lions. He played at Lock and his nickname was "Fourteen". He weighed 14 stone.

== Rugby Union career ==
=== Amateur career ===
Michie also played for Aberdeen GSFP, Langholm RFC, and Aberdeen University. His other clubs were London Scottish and the Army while in the Royal Engineers and Highland Rugby Club. He played 10 games for Leicester Tigers in the 1957–58 season.

=== Provincial career ===
He represented North of Scotland in the first year of the Scottish Inter-District Championship in season 1953–54.

In subsequent seasons this combined North side (which previously contained Midlands District players) became formally known as North and Midlands in the championship. Michie also represented this side.

=== International career ===
Michie was on the 1955 British Lions tour to South Africa. He was also selected for Barbarians.

== Personal life ==
He died on 13 November 2021, at the age of 88.
