= Jimmie Johnston =

Scotland international rugby union player

- Born: James Johnston; 17 September 1925 St Boswells, Scotland
- Died: 7 January 2003 (aged 77) Melrose, Scotland

Rugby union career
- Position: Lock
Amateur team(s)
| Years | Team | Apps | (Points) |
- Melrose
Provincial / State sides
| Years | Team | Apps | (Points) |
- South
International career
| Years | Team | Apps | (Points) |
| 1951–52 | Scotland | 5 | (3) |

James Johnston (17 September 1925 – 7 January 2003) was a Scotland international rugby union footballer. Johnston played as a Lock.

== Rugby career ==
=== Amateur career ===
Johnston played for Melrose.

=== Provincial career ===
Johnston led a South team to play against South Africa in 1951–52.

He played in the first Scottish Inter-District Championship in season 1953–54.

=== International career ===
He was capped for Scotland 5 times between 1951 and 1952, with 4 caps in Five Nations matches.

== Business ==
He founded Baxter Johnson Oils.
