= Erin Cossey =

- Born: Erin Cossey; 29 September 1971 (age 55) Katikati, New Zealand

Rugby union career
- Position: Fly-half
Amateur team(s)
Years	Team	Apps	(Points)
-	Clarkston RFC		
–	Glasgow Southern RFC		
–	Katikati RFC		
Senior career
Years	Team	Apps	(Points)
1997-98	Glasgow Warriors		
Provincial / State sides
Years	Team	Apps	(Points)
1996	Bay of Plenty		
Coaching career
- Years: Team
- 2009-14: Katikati RFC
- 2014-present: Te Puna RFC

Erin Cossey (born 29 September 1971 in Katikati, New Zealand) is a New Zealand Maori former rugby union player. He played professionally in Scotland for Glasgow Rugby, now Glasgow Warriors in the 1997-98 season; and at amateur level for Glasgow Southern RFC. He played at Fly-half.

The fly-half played for Clarkston RFC in 1991, 1992 and 1993. When the club changed its name to Glasgow Southern, he played for the Glasgow Southern RFC too.

Cossey played against Scotland for Bay of Plenty province in 1996.

He was part of the professional provincial side Glasgow squad for the 1997-98 season. He played for Glasgow in the pre-season friendly match against London Scottish at Glasgow Southern's home ground of Braidholm. Cossey came on for Cameron Little and kicked a conversion. Still, London Scottish won the match 49-15.

Cossey continued to play for Glasgow Southern in 1997 and 1998.

In 2009 he became a player-coach at Katikati Rugby & Sports Club. "The boys came and asked me to coach this year and I'd just sold my business and taken up teaching, so it was good timing," Cossey said. "Working with kids has opened my eyes so I said to the boys from the start that my whole focus is turning them into positive role models. We want to pull kids off the street and get them into rugby and keep them active and busy." Cossey taught at Katikati College.

From 2014 Cossey is now coaching New Zealand side Te Puna RFC in the Bay of Plenty province.
