= Glasgow Southern RFC =

Defunct Scottish rugby union club, based in Giffnock

Coordinates: 55.808549°N 4.280934°W

(Scotland) Glasgow Southern
- Full name: Glasgow Southern Rugby Football Club
- Founded: 1995
- Disbanded: 2002; 24 years ago
- Location: Giffnock, Scotland
- Ground: Braidholm

Glasgow Southern RFC was a rugby union team. It was based in Giffnock, East Renfrewshire. Previously known as Clarkston RFC the Club altered its name to Glasgow Southern RFC in an AGM of May 1995. In 2002, the club merged with a Glasgow club Hutchesons Aloysians to form Glasgow Hutchesons Aloysians RFC.

== History ==
Clarkston RFC changed its name to Glasgow Southern in 1995. The club had successfully persuaded many Hutchesons Aloysians players and officials to join the Giffnock club; the change of name was a result of that changing character and an impetus for HA to merge with the new club. However HA refused the merger - and the Giffnock club, now laden with Hutchesons Aloysians players, continued with the new name and as a new club.

Although Southern was in existence for a mere seven years, the timespan of the club bridged the amateur and professional period of rugby union. Rugby Union professionalism in Scotland began in 1996 and the Glasgow Southern club became well placed as a development club to the professional Glasgow Warriors side.

The first batch of Glasgow Thistles picked in 1997–98, a young development side sent to New Zealand by Glasgow District Union, contained Stuart Bryce, Iain Monaghan, Euan Murray and Jan Vos; all players from Southern.

Notably Murray became a Scotland internationalist and played for the British and Irish Lions; and Iain Monaghan became a development coach at Glasgow Warriors.

A brief return for amateur inter-district rugby saw Glasgow District play Scotland U21 in December 2001. Included in the Glasgow district side were Jan Vos and Ross Armour from Southern (as well as Stuart Bryce who had then joined Dalziel).

An agreement reached with a development organisation saw the original Clarkston RFC's 1970 Clubhouse demolished to make way for a health club. A new, state of the art, Clubhouse was formally opened by S.R.U. President Ronnie Young at Braidholm in January 2002.

== Merger ==
The Glasgow Southern name was only to survive for seven years before the merger with Hutchesons Aloysians was again mooted. Glasgow Southern and Hutchesons Aloysians were in the same division; HA at the top, Southern sitting sixth but with better facilities. This time the model of Glasgow Hawks - a successful merged side in the north-west of Glasgow - became an impetus for the south side teams to follow.

Glasgow Southern and Hutchesons Aloysians merged in May 2002 to form Glasgow Hutchesons Aloysians Rugby Football Club.

== Notable former players ==
Over several years a variety of players graduated through the Club participation from both youth and senior level to achieve representative status.

=== Scotland internationalists ===
- (Scotland) Gordon McIlwham
- (Scotland) Euan Murray

=== Glasgow Warriors players ===
- (Scotland) Gordon McIlwham
- (New Zealand) Erin Cossey
- (Scotland) Richard McKnight
- (Scotland) Gavin Blackburn
- (Scotland) Euan Murray
- (Scotland) James Eddie

=== Glasgow District players ===
- (Scotland) Jan Vos
- (Scotland) Ross Armour
- (Scotland) Stuart Bryce

== Honours ==
=== Women ===
- Mull Sevens
  - Champions: 1998
