= Gordon McIlwham =

Scotland international rugby union player

- Born: Gordon McIlwham; 13 November 1969 (age 57) Scotland
- Height: 1.78 m (5 ft 10 in)
- Weight: 112 kg (247 lb)

Rugby union career
- Position: Prop
Amateur team(s)
Years	Team	Apps	(Points)
- Clarkston RFC
–	Glasgow Southern		
–	Glasgow Hawks		
Senior career
Years	Team	Apps	(Points)
1996-2002	Glasgow	100	(5)
2002–03	Bordeaux		
2003–05	Munster	39	(0)
- Correct as of 8 Jun 2011
International career
Years	Team	Apps	(Points)
1998–2003	Scotland	16	(0)
- Correct as of 8 Jun 2011

Gordon McIlwham (born 13 November 1969) is a retired Scottish rugby union player for the amateur Glasgow Hawks, the professional teams Glasgow Rugby (now Glasgow Warriors), Bordeaux-Begles and Munster. He played as a Prop. He also played for Scotland at an international level.

== Amateur level ==
McIlwham started out with Clarkston RFC.
