= Les Allan =

Scotland international rugby union player

- Born: James Leslie Allan; 4 July 1927 Melrose, Scotland
- Died: 9 February 2013 (aged 85) Galashiels, Scotland

Rugby union career
- Position: Centre
Amateur team(s)
Years	Team	Apps	(Points)
- Melrose
Provincial / State sides
Years	Team	Apps	(Points)
- South
International career
Years	Team	Apps	(Points)
1952-53	Scotland	4	(0)

Les Allan (4 March 1927 – 9 February 2013) was a Scotland international rugby union footballer. Allan played as a Centre.

== Rugby career ==
=== Amateur career ===
Allan played for Melrose.

=== Provincial career ===
Allan represented South. He played in the Scottish Inter-District Championship in its debut 1953–54 season.

The next season's campaign in 1954–55 saw South win the championship for the first time in their history. Allan played in South's fixture against Glasgow District, scoring two tries in the match in a South 18-11 win.

=== International career ===
He was capped for Scotland four times from 1952 to 1953, all of the caps coming in the Five Nations matches.
