= Rob McAlpine =

Scottish rugby union player

- Born: Robert Cameron McAlpine; 26 March 1991 (age 35) Scotland
- Height: 2.01 m (6 ft 7 in)
- Weight: 118 kg (260 lb)
- School: Glasgow Academy
- Notable relative(s): Angus Cameron, great-uncle Donald Cameron, great-uncle

Rugby union career
- Position: Lock
Amateur team(s)
Years	Team	Apps	(Points)
- Ayr RFC
Senior career
Years	Team	Apps	(Points)
2011-12	Glasgow Warriors	0	(0)
2012-14	Edinburgh Rugby	10	(0)
2016	Glasgow Warriors	4	(0)
Provincial / State sides
Years	Team	Apps	(Points)
- Glasgow District U16
-	Glasgow District U17		
-	Glasgow District U18		
International career
Years	Team	Apps	(Points)
- Scotland U17
2009-11	Scotland U20	13	(0)
2016-	Scotland Club XV		

Rob McAlpine (born 26 March 1991 in Scotland) is a Scottish rugby union player who plays for Ayr RFC at the Lock position. A former Glasgow Warriors academy player in season 2011-12, he was called back into the Warriors squad on 30 September 2016. He also previously played for Edinburgh Rugby.

== Rugby Union career ==
=== Amateur career ===
McAlpine plays for Ayr.

=== Provincial career ===
A product of Glasgow Academy, McAlpine played for Glasgow District U16, U17 and Glasgow District U18 age grades.

=== Professional career ===
He earned a place in the Glasgow Warriors academy for the season 2011-12 as an Elite Development Player. Although named on the Warriors bench, he did not make a competitive start.

He then played for Edinburgh Rugby and earned his professional debut against Ulster at Raven Hill on 2 March 2012, coming on as a replacement at half time for Grant Gilchrist.

He was called back into the Warriors squad in 2016 when on 30 September 2016 he was named on the bench to play in the Warriors away match to Newport Gwent Dragons at Rodney Parade.

He made his Warriors debut in the Pro12 that night, replacing Josh Strauss.

=== International career ===
He earned Scotland call ups at age grades before getting a Scotland Club XV cap in 2016.
