= J. S. Thomson =

Scotland international rugby union player

J.S. Thomson
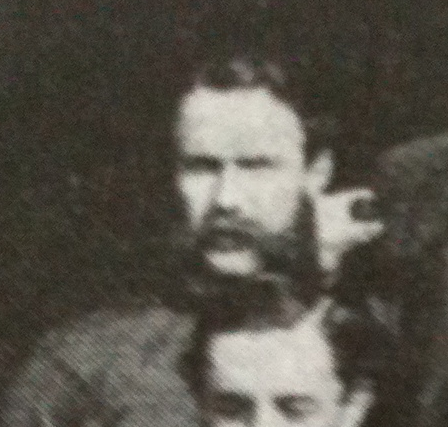
- Born: John Shaw Thomson; 9 August 1845 Glasgow, Scotland
- Died: 22 May 1925 (aged 79) St Giles, London
- School: Glasgow Academy
- University: St Andrew's University

Rugby union career
- Position: Forward
Amateur team(s)
Years	Team	Apps	(Points)
- Glasgow Academicals RFC
–	University of St Andrews RFC		
Provincial / State sides
Years	Team	Apps	(Points)
- Glasgow District
International career
Years	Team	Apps	(Points)
1871	Scotland	1	(0)

John Shaw Thomson was a rugby union international who represented Scotland in the first international rugby match in 1871.

== Early life ==
Thomson's father owned a clothing manufacturing business, Laird & Thomson, located in the Mile End area of Glasgow which employed around 450 people. In acknowledgement of their roots the street was named St Marnock Road ( the company had started in Kilmarnock). George Thomson's business prospered and the family lived in the prestigious Monteith Row, but as the industrialisation of Glasgow continued a pace, the Thomsons like many others moved from the grime and dirt of the east end to the leafier suburbs of Glasgow's West end, in the Woodlands area.

John Shaw Thomson became a pupil at the Glasgow Academy and is recorded as having played for Glasgow Academicals in 1871 and 1872. At that time, the club did not have open membership and had only been formed three years previous as a club for old pupils of Glasgow Academy. Some records suggest he also played for St Andrews University and therefore may have attended that university also.

== Rugby union career ==
J.S. Thomson was selected to play in the first international rugby match in 1871 between Scotland and England. This was played on 27 March 1871 at Raeburn Place, Edinburgh, and won by Scotland. Certain records for the match indicate that he played for Glasgow Academicals at the time, whilst others suggest that he was a University of St Andrews RFC player. It is possible that he was not exclusive to one or the other and therefore may have played for both. In Francis Marshall's 1892 publication, Football; the Rugby union game, he is listed as playing for St Andrews as well, although on one occasion he is referred to as J Thompson in a picture of the 1871 Scotland side and on another occasion he is referred to as W Thomson.

In 1872, J S Thomson was also part of another historic first rugby encounter when he was selected as part of the representative side of Glasgow District, to face a representative side from Edinburgh District. This was the inaugural inter-city match between Glasgow and Edinburgh, that today is known as the 1872 Cup and has the distinction of being the oldest inter-city rugby competition in the world.
