= Dick Allan =

Scotland international rugby union player (born 1939)

- Born: Richard Campbell Allan; 16 March 1939 (age 87) Glasgow, Scotland
- School: Hutchesons' Grammar School

Rugby union career
- Position: Scrum-half
Amateur team(s)
Years	Team	Apps	(Points)
- Hutchesons' GSFP
Provincial / State sides
Years	Team	Apps	(Points)
- Glasgow District
International career
Years	Team	Apps	(Points)
1969	Scotland	1	(0)

Dick Allan (born 16 March 1939) is a former Scottish international rugby union player. Allan played as a scrum-half.

== Rugby union career ==
=== Amateur career ===
Allan went to Hutchesons' Grammar School in Glasgow.

Leaving school Allan then played for Hutchesons' GSFP.

=== Provincial career ===
Allan played for Glasgow District in the Scottish Inter-District Championship, captaining the side.

Allan played in the 1964–65 Scottish Inter-District Championship when Glasgow shared the title with South of Scotland.

=== International career ===
Allan played for Scotland only the once, on 22 February 1969. He played in the Five Nations match at Murrayfield against Ireland. Scotland lost the match 16–0.

Hopes were high for Allan before the match as it was noted he had a 'devastating break'.

In a match where Jim Telfer suffered concussion and Chris Rea suffered a dislocated shoulder for the Scots, The Glasgow Herald later noted: "Though Peter Brown won occasional ball, Allan rarely received tidy distribution. Again from the scrummage with the Scottish heel frequently upset by the Irish wheel, Allan was given much worthless ball. In such circumstances the scrum half did well to prevent the effect of bad ball from being multiplied by the close attention that Colin Telfer was paid by the destructive Jim Davidson. Allan's game had to brave and selfless, and only the once had he the chance to attempt a close quarter break from one of the few rucks that Scotland won, after a charge by Rodger Arneil. Colin Telfer was caught before that thrust could be extended."

=== Death ===
In October 2020, Allan died from complications involving COVID-19 and a broken neck. Due to his funeral being felt inadequate as it was held during the COVID-19 pandemic in 2021, there was a memorial held in his honour at Crookfur Family Centre in May 2025.
