= Norman Mair =

Scotland international rugby union player

- Born: Norman George Robertson Mair; 7 October 1928 Edinburgh, Scotland
- Died: 7 December 2014 (aged 86) Edinburgh, Scotland
- School: Edinburgh Academy; Merchiston Castle School
- University: University of Edinburgh

Rugby union career
- Position: Hooker
Amateur team(s)
Years	Team	Apps	(Points)
- Edinburgh University RFC
Provincial / State sides
Years	Team	Apps	(Points)
- Edinburgh District
International career
Years	Team	Apps	(Points)
1951	Scotland	4	(0)

Norman George Robertson Mair MBE (7 October 1928 – 7 December 2014) was a Scottish international rugby union and cricket player. He later became a journalist for The Scotsman reporting on rugby and golf, and also wrote for Rugby World.

== Life ==
Mair was born 7 October 1928 in Edinburgh, the youngest of the 11 surviving children of Elizabeth Mackay Bisset (1882-1950) and Alexander William Mair (1875-1928), professor of Greek at the University of Edinburgh. On 13 November 1928 his father died in a fire at the family home, 9 Corennie Drive, Morningside, Edinburgh.

He was educated at Merchiston Castle School (1942-1947).

=== Rugby Union ===
He studied at the University of Edinburgh where he played for Edinburgh University RFC.

He was selected for the provincial Edinburgh District side and played in the Scottish Inter-District Championship. He won the title with Edinburgh in the inaugural 1953-54 season and was the championship's top points scorer of that season.

He won four caps for the Scotland national rugby union team in 1951.

He was inducted to the Scottish Rugby Hall of Fame in 2013.

=== Cricket ===
He also played for the Scotland national cricket team.

Mair played for Scotland in 1952. He was capped once, playing against Worcestershire. He scored four not out in his only innings.

=== Sports journalism ===
Bill McLaren rated Mair as one of the best rugby journalists that Scotland produced:

"I always have had a high regard for the coverage by Norman Mair, formerly of The Scotsman.

"Norman never was persona grata with all members of the Scottish Rugby Union because he wrote what he felt and had the ear of some very influential people in the game. There have been times when I have had to read one of Norman's sentences two or three times over in order to get the gist, but he has been one of the most perceptive of analysts and his articles have been both enlightening and enjoyable - especially the little humorous stories that were so often his punchlines."

Writing of the Australian player Mark Ella, he once said: "Ella has hands so adhesive that when he fumbled a ball against Scotland (in 1984) you would not have been surprised to see those Australians of the appropriate religious persuasion cross themselves"

Mair was always outspoken in his opinions. In the early fifties, for example, criticising the large number of new caps in each game in 1953 and 1954, he said that he consider the "inhabitants of lunatic asylums... had a fair grievance while the S.R.U. selectors walked around free and uncertified."

He was appointed MBE in the 1994 Birthday Honours.

He died at Thorburn Manor Care Home in Colinton.

== Family ==
His daughter is Suzi Mair, who produces STV News at Six.

== Selected publications ==
- Mair, Norman, 1994, Muirfield, Mainstream Publishing
- John Rutherford and Roy Laidlaw with Norman Mair, Rugby Partnership: Stanley Paul, 1988. ISBN 0-09-172703-0

== Bibliography ==
- Bath, Richard (ed.) The Scotland Rugby Miscellany (Vision Sports Publishing Ltd, 2007 ISBN 1-905326-24-6)
- McLaren, Bill Talking of Rugby (1991, Stanley Paul, London ISBN 0-09-173875-X)
- Massie, Allan A Portrait of Scottish Rugby (Polygon, Edinburgh; ISBN 0-904919-84-6)
