= Macbeth Duncan =

Scotland international rugby union player

- Born: Macbeth Moir Duncan; 1 September 1866 Aberdeen, Scotland
- Died: 2 October 1942 (aged 76) Cults, Aberdeen, Scotland
- School: Cargilfield; Fettes College

Rugby union career
- Position: Three Quarters
Amateur team(s)
| Years | Team | Apps | (Points) |
| 1885 | Cambridge University | | |
| 1888 | Fettesian-Lorettonians | | |
| 1889 | Aberdeen University | | |
Provincial / State sides
| Years | Team | Apps | (Points) |
| 1889 | East of Scotland District | | |
International career
| Years | Team | Apps | (Points) |
| 1888 | Scotland | 1 | (0) |

48th President of the Scottish Rugby Union
- In office 1927–1928
- Preceded by: James Aikman Smith
- Succeeded by: David McCowan

Colonel Macbeth Duncan (1 September 1866 – 2 October 1942) was a Scotland international rugby union player. He later became the 48th President of the Scottish Rugby Union.

== Rugby Union career ==
=== Amateur career ===
Duncan was schooled at Cargilfield before moving on to Fettes College. He played for Fettesian-Lorettonians.

After Fettes, Duncan went up to Clare College, Cambridge. He played for Cambridge University and captained the side. He obtained his mathematics degree with honours before then studying law at both Aberdeen and Edinburgh universities.

He also played for Aberdeen University while studying law there.

=== Provincial career ===
He played for East of Scotland District against West of Scotland District on 26 January 1889.

=== International career ===
He was capped once for Scotland in 1888. for a Home Nations match against Wales in Newport.

=== Administrative career ===
He was President of the Scottish Rugby Union for the period 1927 to 1928.

== Law career ==
His father Charles Duncan was an advocate and Procurator-Fiscal for Aberdeenshire.

Duncan studied law at both University of Aberdeen and at University of Edinburgh. He served an apprenticeship with Peter Duguid (advocate), Henry Peterkin (solicitor), and with the firm Mackenzie and Cormack in Edinburgh. His brother W. O. Duncan was a partner in the firm with Duguid and Peterkin and so Duncan then joined the firm Duguid, Peterkin and Duncan. On the retirement of Duguid, Macbeth Duncan became a partner and the firm was then called Peterkin and Duncans.

He became a President of the Society of Advocates in Aberdeen from 1928 to 1930. In 1928, he was made Sheriff-Substitute of Aberdeen.

Duncan specialised in mercantile law. He acted for the Board of Trade on their inquiries on the loss of vessels.

== Military career ==
He was chairman of the City of Aberdeen Territorial Army. Duncan held a commission at the local Artillery Corps. In the First World War he was sent to France as head of the 1st Highland Brigade (Royal Artillery). He was decorated with a C. M. G. In 1933, he was made an Honorary Colonel of the 75th Highland Field Brigade in the Royal Artillery (T. A.)

== Outside of rugby union, law and military ==
Duncan was a keen golfer. He became Secretary of Aberdeen Golf Club, a post which he held for 28 years.

He tried to promote a golfing Northern Counties tournament and became the first chairman of the North-East Association of the Scottish Golf Union.
