= Peter Anton (rugby union) =

Scotland international rugby union player

- Born: Peter A. Anton; 25 June 1850 Errol, Perth and Kinross, Scotland
- Died: 10 December 1911 (aged 61) Kilsyth, Scotland

Rugby union career
- Position: Forward
Amateur team(s)
Years	Team	Apps	(Points)
- St. Andrews
International career
Years	Team	Apps	(Points)
1872-73	Scotland	1	(0)

Peter Anton (25 June 1850 – 10 December 1911) was a Scotland international rugby union player who represented Scotland in the 1872–73 Home Nations rugby union matches.

== Rugby Union career ==
=== Amateur career ===
Anton was a divinity student at the University of St Andrews. He played as a forward for St. Andrews. He played for the team in the Scottish Unofficial Championship.

=== International career ===
He played in the Home Nations match in the 1872–73 season against England. This was the home match on 3 March 1873 at Hamilton Crescent, Glasgow. Years later, Anton described the international 'as hard an international that has ever been played'.

== Personal life ==
Anton became a minister in the Church of Scotland. He wrote books on history, curling, angling, religion, and literature.
