= Old Aloysians RFC =

Coordinates: 55.883208°N 4.168243°W

(Scotland) Old Aloysians RFC
- Full name: Old Aloysians Rugby Football Club
- Union: Scottish Rugby Union
- Founded: 1955
- Disbanded: 1990
- Location: Glasgow, Scotland
- Region: Glasgow
- Ground(s): Ogilivie Ground, Millerston
Team kit

Old Aloysians RFC was an amateur rugby union club in Glasgow, Scotland. The club no longer exists. In 1990, they merged with rivals Hutcheson's GSFP to form Hutchesons Aloysians.

== History ==
=== Formation ===
The club was formed in 1955 by former pupils of the St. Aloysius College in Garnethill, Glasgow. Initially the team was formed for the sole purpose of a challenge match against the St. Aloysius College 1st XV rugby side. (An Old Aloysians FC side was previously formed to play football and competed in the West Amateur Cup.)

The success of the 1955 challenge match led to the Old Aloysians club being founded on a permanent basis and regular fixtures were arranged.

The first fixture was against Hutcheson's GSFP, coinciding with the invitation from Hutchesons’ Grammar School to Saint Aloysius’ College Ist XV to undertake regular fixtures.

=== Open side ===
Although the club was fed by the former pupils of St. Aloysius College, it was an 'open' club and membership was open to non-former pupils.

=== National League ===
The side joined the National League in 1973. During the 1980s it slid from Division 4 to Division 6 in season 1988–89.

Initially, there was optimism for the coming season 1989-90 as the team felt comfortably placed in Division 6. It had also seen a tour by Milan University RFC to play the side in 1988–89. It was hoped that as last season's St. Aloysius College 1st XV was successful, its graduates might bolster the side and boost, in particular, the away record of the Old Aloysians side.

For the 1989–90 season, the club had organised that Preston Grasshoppers would play the side on their tour.

However this start of season optimism was misplaced. They finished bottom of Division 6 with only 1 win and 1 draw in the league campaign, conceding 253 points in the process. At the end of the season the club was to be relegated to Division 7.

This led to thoughts of merger and the Old Aloysians began talks with Hutcheson's GSFP.

== Merger ==
It was noted at the end of season 1989-90 that Hutcheson's GSFP and Old Aloysians were considering a merger. This was not without its detractors as The Glasgow Herald newspaper then noted: 'Some of the old boys of both Hutchie and Wally Dishes - as the Jesuit College in Garnethill was often less than affectionately known - are already convinced it is a bad idea.'

The Old Aloysians members approved the merger first.

The Old Aloysians were about to be found, from next season 1990–91, in Division 7 of the McEwan's National League, having just been relegated from Division 6 in the current season.

The merger then just had to be approved by Hutcheson's GSFP to go through.

The SRU chief at the time, a former President of Hutchesons GSFP RFC, Jimmy McNeil, declared himself neutral on the merger. This was taken as tacit acceptance and the merger went through by 57 votes to 8 on Thursday 24 May 1990 at a Hutchesons GSFP EGM.

The new club Hutchesons Aloysians would take Hutcheson's GSFP's place in the league in Division 4 of the McEwan's National League for the coming 1990–91 season.

== Honours ==
- McEwans Division 5 winners: 1977-78
