= Gordon Masson =

Scottish rugby union player

- Born: Gordon B. Masson

Rugby union career
- Position: Scrum half
Amateur team(s)
| Years | Team | Apps | (Points) |
| 1953-61 | Gordonians | | |
| 1959 | RAF & RN XV | | |
Provincial / State sides
| Years | Team | Apps | (Points) |
| 1959 | Aberdeen Select XV | | |

105th President of the Scottish Rugby Union
- In office 1991–1992
- Preceded by: Charlie Stewart
- Succeeded by: Robin Charters

Gordon Masson was a Scottish rugby union player. He was the 105th President of the Scottish Rugby Union.

== Rugby Union career ==
=== Amateur career ===
He played for Gordonians.

He played for a combined RAF and Royal Navy side in the RAF Services Cup in 1959. He captained the side. He was a Pilot Officer attached to the Education Department.

=== Provincial career ===
Masson played for an Aberdeen Select XV against the Scottish Exiles in a Christmas tie in 1959.

=== Administrative career ===
He was secretary of the North of Scotland District union in 1969.

Masson rose through the ranks in the SRU. As Treasurer he was famously opposed to the creation of a rugby union world cup. He told Nicholas Shehadie of Australia in 'no uncertain terms that rugby was their game and they didn't need us; a World Cup would be staged over his dead body.' Shehadie replied: 'When the World Cup is held don't bother coming.'

Scotland and Ireland voted against a World Cup in 1985. New Zealand, England, Wales, Australia and France voted in favour and the World Cup thus began. England and Wales originally voted with Scotland and Ireland but switched their vote when the first vote was tied. Scotland and Ireland were fierce protectors of rugby union's amateur status. They feared - correctly - that the creation of a Rugby World Cup would lead to professionalism in the sport. By the time of 1995, when the IRB launched an investigation into professionalism in the sport headed by Louis Luyt, only one union - the Argentine Rugby Union - was not paying their players. All others, including Scotland and Ireland, were paying their players in one way or another.

Masson was elected vice-president of the SRU in 1989.

Masson became the 105th President of the Scottish Rugby Union. He served the standard one year from 1991 to 1992.

As part of his duties as president, he had to escort Princess Anne unto the pitch at Murrayfield Stadium in the 1991 World Cup. Shehadie confronted Masson and pinched him to see if he was still alive.

== Outside of rugby union ==
Masson was a solicitor in Aberdeen.
