= Robin Charters =

Scotland international rugby union player

- Born: Robert Gray Charters; 29 October 1930 Hawick, Scotland
- Died: 20 May 2013 (aged 82) Hawick, Scotland

Rugby union career
- Position: Centre
Amateur team(s)
Years	Team	Apps	(Points)
- Hawick
Provincial / State sides
Years	Team	Apps	(Points)
1954	South of Scotland District		
International career
Years	Team	Apps	(Points)
1955	Scotland	3	(0)

106th President of the Scottish Rugby Union
- In office 1992–1993
- Preceded by: Gordon Masson
- Succeeded by: Jock Steven

Robin Charters (29 October 1930 – 20 May 2013) was a Scotland international rugby union player. He became the 106th President of the Scottish Rugby Union.

== Rugby Union career ==
=== Amateur career ===
Charters played for Hawick.

=== Provincial career ===
He played for South of Scotland District in the 1954–55 Scottish Inter-District Championship.

=== International career ===
He played for Scotland 3 times in 1955.

=== Administrative career ===
He became the 106th President of the Scottish Rugby Union. He served the standard one year from 1992 to 1993.
