= Graham Ross (rugby union) =

Scotland international rugby union player

- Born: Graham Tullis Ross; 5 July 1928 Edinburgh, Scotland
- Died: 13 February 2009 (aged 80) Edinburgh, Scotland
- School: George Watsons College

Rugby union career
- Position: Fly-half
Amateur team(s)
Years	Team	Apps	(Points)
- Watsonians
–	Edinburgh Academicals		
–	Wasps		
Provincial / State sides
Years	Team	Apps	(Points)
- Edinburgh District
-	Co-Optimists		
International career
Years	Team	Apps	(Points)
1954	Scotland	4	(0)

Graham Ross (5 July 1928 – 13 February 2009) was a Scotland international rugby union footballer, who played as a fly-half.

== Rugby union career ==
=== Amateur career ===
Ross played for Watsonians.

He also played for Edinburgh Academicals and Wasps.

=== Provincial career ===
Ross played for Edinburgh District. He played in Scottish Inter-District Championship. He played in the 1954–55 season.

He played for the Co-Optimists.

=== International career ===
He was capped for Scotland four times in 1954.

== Business career ==
Ross trained in the Scottish Hotel School and then worked in the Savoy Hotel in London and then in Switzerland.

He joined McVities Guest in 1955 as a Catering Director.

This was taken over by Rank Hovis MacDougall in 1963. Ross worked for them before setting up his own company Ross's Restaurants.

He sold the company to United Biscuits in 1975.

He became the managing director of Crawford Catering Company.

In 1981 he worked as an executive director of Scottish Business in the Community. Ross set up 47 Local Enterprise trusts around Scotland creating jobs.

He received an OBE in 1990.
