= Clarkston RFC =

Scottish rugby union club, based in Giffnock

Coordinates: 55.788077°N 4.268884°W

(Scotland) Clarkston
- Full name: Clarkston Rugby Football Club
- Founded: 1937
- Disbanded: 1995; 31 years ago
- Location: Giffnock and Clarkston, Scotland
- Ground(s): Overlee (1937-1971); Braidholm (1971-1995)
Team kit

Clarkston RFC is a former rugby union team. It was based in Giffnock and Clarkston, East Renfrewshire. Created in 1937, it became Glasgow Southern in 1995.

== History ==
=== Formation ===
In 1937, Clarkston Rugby Club was formed, taking advantage of the local authority pitch and pavilion at Overlee Playing Fields. Clarkston played in red jerseys with white collars, black shorts and red socks. They were admitted to Glasgow District Rugby Union that same year.

Clarkston was an "Open" club, created by a variety of former pupil rugby players who did not wish to undertake cross city travel to indulge in their sport. To highlight this: the first club chairman was a Glasgow Academical; the first President a Glasgow High Former Pupil; and the longest serving Club Captain and Coach, Andrew Williams, a product of Allan Glen's.

=== Growth ===
Although the Second World War curtailed progress, in the AGM of 28^{th} March of 1956 they changed their name to Clarkston RFC; in 1958 their players Andy Williams and Ivor Davies represented Glasgow District, Jim McKinnon represented West District and Williams, Davies and Ray Veitch represented Renfrewshire; and in 1959 the club became a member of the Scottish Rugby Union.

=== Sevens tournament ===
Further evidence of this ambition was found in their annual Sevens tournament, started 1961. It was hoped that inviting 'bigger clubs' to Clarkston would raise the club's profile and help them gain national league entry.

Undeterred by a 16-week frost in the first quarter of 1963 throughout Scotland - that saw the Overlee Playing Grounds become bone hard and unsuitable for play (like most other grounds) - the players were bussed to Barassie on the Ayrshire coast to train. As a result, when the rugby calendar returned in March the Clarkston RFC players were the fittest rugby players in Scotland.

=== New colours and move ===
For the 1965 - 66 season, the club changed its strip to a red, white and green hooped jersey, white shorts and red socks. Further change was ahead and after years of tireless fund raising saw the club's new facility at Braidholm opened by S.R.U. President Charlie Drummond in January 1971. The first match at Braidholm saw Clarkston play Glasgow Academicals.

== National League ==
A new National League structure was implemented in 1973 by the Scottish Rugby Union. The Club entered the new leagues at the bottom Division 4 level, but then rose to Division 2 in subsequent years.

=== Comparative rise ===
This rise through the Scottish Leagues was noted by The Glasgow Herald in 1981. It noted that originally Glasgow had 16 teams involved in the new league set up in 1973. In 1981, only 14 remained and of that number the Clarkston club was one of a select few - along with Kilmarnock, Stirling County and Dalziel - that had actually risen in the league set-up.

In February 1982 Clarkston announced the leasing, from Eastwood District Council, of one and half acres next to Braidholm Park to allow the club to have 5 mini-pitches for youth development.

=== Frost and farming ===
Braidholm, like Overlee, was susceptible to frost in the winter. In 1977, Clarkston became the first club rugby team to cover their pitch with straw to prevent this, although this technique was used before in international fixtures. Over 200 tons of straw was used for the 1st XV and 2nd XV pitches, thanks to one of their players who was a local farmer. Initiatives like this meant the club continued to grow.

=== Changing character, new club ===
Stuart Wallace, the then Clarkston president, suggested in a 1995 newsletter to members that the club and ambitions have outgrown the name. He stated: "Although our roots lie in Overlee and the expanded suburb of Clarkston, we severed that connection in reality some 25 years ago".

With three pitches. floodlights, 250 seater stand and expanded Clubhouse, in recognition of its changing character and by a significant membership majority at the May 1995 A.G.M., the Club altered its name to Glasgow Southern RFC.

Critics said the name change and the 'changing character' came about as the side set the objective of swallowing up Hutchesons Aloysians. In the club's last year as Clarkston it persuaded many of the Hutcheson Aloysians players and officials to join the Giffnock club; and it proposed a merger with HA - which was rejected by the Auldhouse club.

== Honours ==
- Clarkston Sevens
  - Champions: 1979, 1987
- Craigielea Sevens
  - Champions: 1981
- Arran Sevens
  - Champions: 1991
- Allan Glen's Sevens
  - Champions: 1985
- Glasgow and District Cup
  - Champions: 1989-90
- Renfrewshire Cup
  - Runners up 1989–90.

== Notable former players ==
=== Scotland internationalists ===
- (Scotland) Gordon McIlwham

=== Glasgow Warriors players ===
- (Scotland) Gordon McIlwham
- (New Zealand) Erin Cossey
- (Scotland) Fergus Wallace
- (Scotland) James Eddie

=== Glasgow District players ===
- (Scotland) Andy Williams
- (Scotland) Ivor Davies
