= Percy Friebe =

Scotland international rugby union player (1931–2019)

- Born: John Percy Friebe; 9 May 1931
- Died: 17 May 2019 (aged 88)
- School: High School of Glasgow

Rugby union career
- Position: No. 8
Amateur team(s)
Years	Team	Apps	(Points)
- Glasgow HSFP
–	Worcester Warriors		
–	Moseley		
–	RAFRU		
Provincial / State sides
Years	Team	Apps	(Points)
- Glasgow District
International career
Years	Team	Apps	(Points)
1952	Scotland	1	(0)

Percy Friebe (born 9 May 1931 - 17 May 2019) is a former Scotland international rugby union player. Friebe played as a No. 8.

== Rugby union career ==
=== Amateur career ===
Friebe played for Glasgow HSFP.

He also played for Worcester Warriors, Moseley and the RAF rugby union.

Friebe scored the first ever try at Burnbrae when Glasgow HSFP opened West of Scotland's new ground in 1960.

=== Provincial career ===
Friebe played for Glasgow District. He won the 1951-52 Inter-City against Edinburgh District.

He played for Glasgow in the Scottish Inter-District Championship. He played in the 1953–54 Scottish Inter-District Championship and the 1954-55 championship.

He also played for the combined Glasgow-Edinburgh 'Cities' side against South Africa.

=== International career ===
He was capped for Scotland once, in 1952, in the Five Nations match against England at Murrayfield.

=== Administration ===
Friebe is the Honorary President of Glasgow High Kelvinside.
