= Hutchesons Aloysians =

Defunct Scottish rugby union club, based in Glasgow

Coordinates: 55.813933°N 4.309912°W

(Scotland) Hutchesons Aloysians RFC
- Full name: Hutchesons Aloysians Rugby Football Club
- Union: Scottish Rugby Union
- Founded: 1990
- Disbanded: 2002; 24 years ago
- Location: Glasgow, Scotland
- Region: Glasgow
- Ground: Auldhouse
Team kit

Hutchesons Aloysians RFC was an amateur rugby union club in Glasgow, Scotland. The club no longer exists. In 2002, they merged with Glasgow Southern to form Glasgow Hutchesons Aloysians RFC.

== History ==
=== Formation ===
The club was founded in 1990 with the merger of Hutcheson's GSFP and Old Aloysians.

As a struggling club about to be demoted to Division 7 of the McEwan's National League; the Old Aloysions members approved the merger first.

Hutcheson's GSFP were in Division 4 of the National League. Their EGM to approve the merger on 24 May 1990 was won by 57 votes to 8.

The new club Hutchesons Aloysians would take Hutcheson's GSFP's place in the league in Division 4 of the McEwan's National League for the coming 1990–91 season.

=== National League ===
Starting in Division 4, the side secured promotion in its first year to Division 3. Hutchesons Aloysians then skirted between Division 3 and 4 before they finally made a challenge for the Division 3 title.

The club initially suffered as it lost players and officials to Clarkston RFC who were pushing for a merger with Hutchesons Aloysians. Hutchesons Aloysians refused the merger; and although Club President Bernard Dunn initially voted for the merge he was later to say: "Thankfully, we’ve both managed to move forward from what was a very difficult time, and I believe it would now serve little purpose. The HA merger was a unique one, founded on the traditions of two good schools, and that’s why it works so well. I think we’re now of a size where we don’t need to merge."

Anthony Posa became Hutchesons Aloysians first full international cap when he played for Croatia against Czechoslovakia in a World Cup qualifier in October 2001.

In December 2000 he was interviewed before a match against Boroughmuir: "This is the first season I have played in the UK," says 29-year-old Posa. "So it is the first time I have played in the conditions you have in the depths of winter. Glasgow, particularly the guys at H/As, has treated me well. But the rain and mud are something else."

In the club's last season, before a merger with Glasgow Southern, Hutchesons Aloysians finally ensured promotion to Division 2. They won the title beating Berwick 37–15.

== Merger ==
On 12 February 2002, officials from Glasgow Southern and Hutchesons Aloysians met again to discuss a merger. At the time both played in the same league, although Hutchesons Aloysians were at the top of the table about to secure promotion. A potential higher league position in a higher division on offer was an incentive for Glasgow Southern to agree to the merger.

It was recognised that Glasgow Southern's facilities at Braidholm were far greater than those of Hutchesons Aloysians. That was an incentive for Hutchesons Aloysians to agree to the merger.

A further incentive to both teams was the success of the Glasgow Hawks merger. It was hoped that by merging two relatively strong Glasgow teams they could emulate the success of the Hawks and then begin to challenge the Anniesland side.

The merger went ahead and the two teams merged to form Glasgow Hutchesons Aloysians (GHA) for the start of the 2002–03 season.

GHA now has one of the largest catchment areas in Scotland, with a virtual monopoly on the south side of Glasgow plus several rugby-playing schools across the city feeding into their ranks.

== Honours ==
- Division 4 - 2nd place, 1990–91, promoted to Division 3
- Division 3 - 1st place, 2001–02, promoted to Division 2
- Glasgow City Sevens Champions: 1997

== Notable former players ==
=== Notable non-Scottish players ===
The following is a list of notable non-Scottish international representative former Glasgow players:

Croatia

- (Croatia) Anthony Posa

=== Glasgow District players ===
- (Scotland) I. Whiteley
- (Scotland) N. Barrett
- (Scotland) R. Au
- (Scotland) Fergus Wallace
