= Aberdeen University RFC =

Scottish rugby union club, based in Aberdeen

(Scotland) Aberdeen University Rugby Football Club
- Union: Scottish Rugby Union
- Founded: 1870
- Location: Aberdeen, Scotland
- League(s): Men: Caledonia North Non-League; Women: Scottish Women's North Two
- 2024–25: Men: Caledonia North Non-League; Women: Scottish Women's North Three, 3rd of 5
Team kit

Aberdeen University Rugby Football Club (AURFC) is the rugby union team at the University of Aberdeen in Scotland. The men's team play in Caledonia North Non-League; the women's team play in the university leagues.

== History ==
It is one of the oldest rugby club in the North East of Scotland, (founded in 1870). Its traditional playing venue has been Kings Playing Fields right in the old Aberdeen and the centre of campus for the University of Aberdeen, the fifth oldest university in Britain. It was not until 1882 that AURFC affiliated to the Scottish Rugby Union, it was the 17th club to join the SRU structure and the first club north of Edinburgh to join after the University of St Andrews RFC, which is one of the founder members of the Scottish Rugby Union.

== Decline and rebirth ==
AURFC was disciplined by the Scottish Rugby Union for not fulfilling fixtures in the late 1990s. This resulted in the club being removed from the SRU league structure and forced to start from the bottom division. This was the lowest point in the club's long and distinguished history. With Aberdeen Grammar being demoted from the Scottish Premier league a void of high class rugby teams in Aberdeen existed and resulted in many university players returning from clubs to play for AURFC. Several seasons of straight promotions in the beginning of the new century has seen the team rise to Caledonian Division League 1 under the coaching of Campbell Scott 2006/2014 and also a return to the first division of the Scottish Universities Sport and BUCS Leagues and won Division 1A in 2010.

== Achievements ==
The club's achievements have been considerable. Most notably was the 2007/08 Scottish Hydro Electric Scottish Rugby Union Plate victory at Murrayfield. This was the first time a university side has ever reached the final of an SRU competition. They followed up this success in season 2008/09 when they successful defended their title with a 33–10 win against Duns. In the same year the university 1st XV was promoted to Division 1A and narrowly missed out on winning the league coming in second place, but in 2010 the 1st XV won Scotland's top University league. The real halcyon period for AURFC was in the 70's when under the tutelage of Mal Reid they dominated University rugby in Scotland winning seven championships and providing countless players and captains for Scottish Universities. In 1975, the Scottish Universities team that beat England away had 10 Aberdeen players in the fifteen.

== Affiliations ==
AURFC is a full member of Aberdeen University Sports Union and the Scottish Rugby Union.

== Notable players ==
The club throughout history had rugby players that represented Scotland and the British and Irish Lions.

Since the dawn of the professional era, the club has not had any Scottish international or British Lions players again but annually boasts several age group Scottish internationals and in 2008/09 had 15 players selected for the Scottish Universities squad.

- Ronald Cumming, the first AURFC international cap in 1921, when he played against Wales for Scotland
- Donny Innes, Scotland in 1939 and 1946
- E.T.S Michie, the first University of Aberdeen British and Irish Lions player in the 1955 tour to South Africa
- Macbeth Duncan

== Aberdeen University Sevens ==
The Aberdeen University Sevens began in 1890. Outside the Borders the only Sevens tournament earlier was the Aberdeen F.C. Sevens tournament of 1889; thus sevens rugby reached Aberdeen before Edinburgh, Glasgow, Dundee, Stirling or Inverness.

== Honours ==
=== Men ===
- Aberdeen University Sevens
  - Champions: 1890, 1893
- Scottish University Sevens
  - Champions: 1974, 1975, 1976, 1977, 1979
- Aberdeen F.C. Sevens
  - Champions: 1889, 1890, 1891, 1893
- Garioch Sevens
  - Champions: 1980, 1996

=== Women ===
- North East Sevens
  - Champions: 2019

== Bibliography ==
- Godwin, Terry Complete Who's Who of International Rugby (Cassell, 1987, ISBN 0-7137-1838-2)
- Jones, J.R. Encyclopedia of Rugby Football (Robert Hale, London, 1958)
- Massie, Allan A Portrait of Scottish Rugby (Polygon, Edinburgh; ISBN 0-904919-84-6)
