= Perthshire RFC =

Scottish rugby union club, based in Perth

(Scotland) Perthshire RFC
- Full name: Perthshire Rugby Football Club
- Nickname: The Eagles
- Founded: 1868 (158 years ago)
- Location: Perth, Scotland
- Ground: North Inch
- President: Graham Binnie
- Captain(s): Alexandra Ward & Daniel Rae
- League: Caledonia Division One Midlands
- 2025–26: Caledonia Division One Midlands, 1st of 10 <--North conference-->
1st kit	2nd kit

Official website
- www.perthshire-rfc.co.uk

Perthshire Rugby Football Club, formerly known as Perthshire Academicals, is a rugby union club located in the city of Perth, Scotland. In 2024, the 1st XV team was relegated from the National Leagues. They now play in Caledonia Region League Division One.

== History ==
Founded in 1868, it is one of the oldest rugby clubs in Scotland. Perthshire was a consistently successful club in the third division of the old National League in Scotland until recently. Over the seasons 2003–04, 2004–05 and 2005–06, the club gained successive promotions, reaching Scottish Premiership Division 3 for the first time in the 2006–07 season. They remained in this league until 2012–13 season when they were relegated to Caledonia Region League Division 1.

Perthshire also put a lot of emphasis into coaching youth players. The club has a development team who coach the youth teams and make regular visits to schools in the area to promote rugby. Perthshire recently launched its centre of excellence, which was the first in the country.

In February 2020, the club's then-captain Adam Pattinson, 36, was killed in road accident while riding his bicycle to work (at Craigclowan Preparatory School) on the A912 Perth-to-Muirhead road.

In May 2023, the club's women's XV reached the National Bowl Final played at the DAM Health Stadium, Murrayfield.

The women's XV entered Caledonian Midlands/East Region League 2 (women's) in season 2023-24.

The club's first XV was relegated from the National Leagues, the fifth tier of rugby in Scotland. As of 2024, they played in the Caledonia Region League Division One.

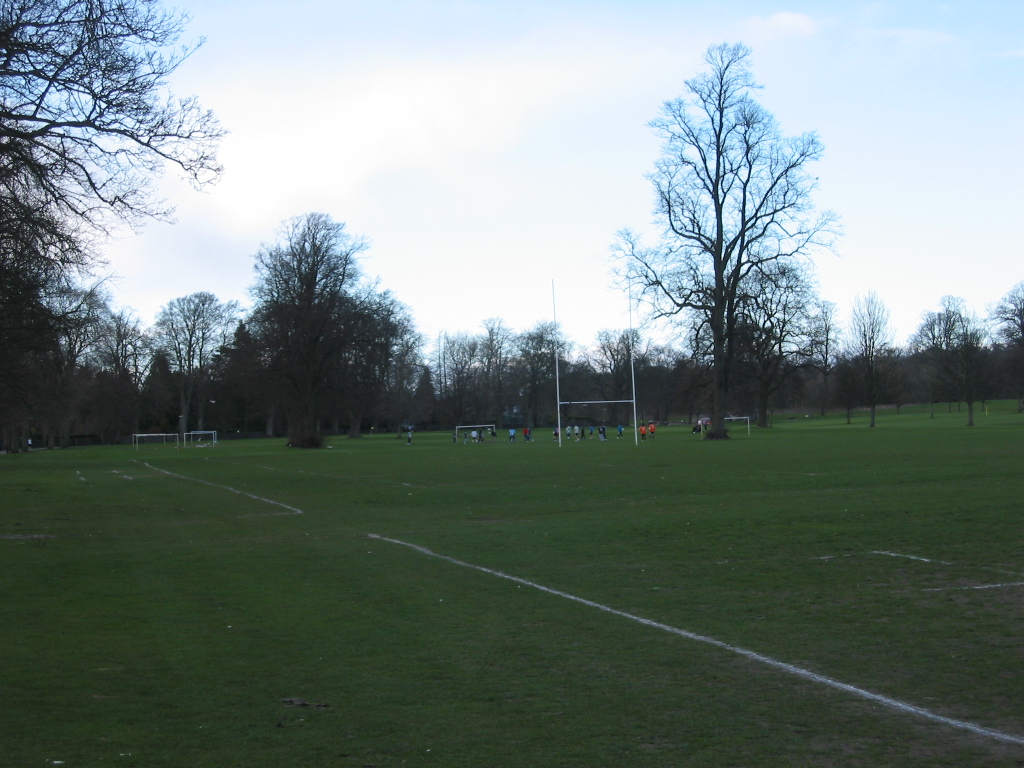
The pitches on the North Inch

== Honours ==
- Scottish League Championship, fourth tier
  - Champions (1): 2005–06

== Notable players ==
Perthshire has provided Scottish internationalist with the first being Dr R W Irvine and Dr Charles Reid during the 1880s. Welsh captain J A G William played for the club in the early 1950s. Jimmy Greenwood was the club's last international cap. He toured South Africa with the British and Irish Lions in 1955. In more recent times Perthshire has provided the Scotland Sevens team with one of their Top Try Scorers. James Fleming played for Perthshire from the age of 7 up until the age of 21. During his time with Perth he picked up the award for Premier 3 Player of the Season in 2008/09. Fleming was a member of the 12-man squad who lifted the London 7s Cup in 2015, where he exhibited is admirable turn of pace and power to score Scotland's first try in 27–26 win over South Africa in the tournament climax. He currently has amassed 555 points for Scotland.

== SRU presidents ==
Former Perthshire Academical players have been President of the SRU:

- 1902-03 Roger Davidson
