= Bill Relph =

Scotland rugby union player (1928–2023)

- Born: William Keith Linford Relph; 21 November 1928 Edinburgh, Scotland
- Died: 18 January 2023 (aged 94) Southport, England

Rugby union career
- Position: Hooker
Amateur team(s)
| Years | Team | Apps | (Points) |
| 1951- | Stewart's College FP | | |
Provincial / State sides
| Years | Team | Apps | (Points) |
| 1953 | Edinburgh District | | |
International career
| Years | Team | Apps | (Points) |
| 1955 | Scotland | 4 | (0) |

William Keith Linford Relph (21 November 1928 – 18 January 2023) was a Scotland rugby union international player.

== Rugby Union career ==
=== Amateur career ===
Relph played for Stewart's College FP. Relph was a noted sevens player and won the Melrose Sevens with Stewart's College FP in 1956. During Relph's time at the club they also won the Langholm Sevens in 1951 and 1957; the Hawick Sevens in 1952 and 1959; the Gala Sevens in 1952; and Jed-Forest Sevens in 1959 and 1960. He captained Stewart's College FP in the 1957–58 season when they won the Scottish Unofficial Championship.

=== Provincial career ===
Relph played for Edinburgh District.

=== International career ===
Relph was capped by Scotland to play France in 1955. He went on to play for Scotland a further three times that same season.

== Family ==
Relph married Lucy Celia Wass (1933–2008) in May 1955, two months after playing for Scotland at Twickenham. Relph and Wass had four children.
