= 1955–56 Scottish Inter-District Championship =

Rugby union competition

- Countries: Scotland
- Date: 1955–56
- Champions: Glasgow District
- Runners-up: Edinburgh District
- Matches played: 6

The 1955–56 Scottish Inter-District Championship was a rugby union competition for Scotland's district teams.

This season saw the third formal Scottish Inter-District Championship.

Glasgow District won the competition with two wins and a draw.

== 1955-56 League Table ==
Team	P	W	D	L	PF	PA	+/-	Pts
Glasgow District	3	2	1	0	33	22	+11	5
Edinburgh District	3	1	2	0	30	9	+21	4
North and Midlands	3	1	0	2	17	41	-24	2
South	3	0	1	2	17	25	-8	1

== Results ==
Date	Try	Conversion	Penalty	Dropped goal	Goal from mark	Notes
1948–1970	3 points	2 points	3 points	3 points	3 points	

=== Round 1 ===
22 October 1955

South	11 – 16	Glasgow District
	Preview; Report

Riverside Park, Jedburgh
Referee: J. A. S. Taylor (Musselburgh)

South:
Glasgow District:

=== Round 2 ===
29 October 1955

North and Midlands	3 – 24	Edinburgh District
	Preview; Report

Linksfield Stadium, Aberdeen
Referee: A. I. Dickie (Gala)

North and Midlands:
Edinburgh District:

=== Round 3 ===
12 November 1955

North and Midlands	6 – 3	South
	Preview; Report

McKane Park, Dunfermline

North and Midlands:
South:

=== Round 4 ===
19 November 1955

Glasgow District	14 – 8	North and Midlands
	Preview; Report

Old Anniesland
Referee: J. Ross (Heriots FP)

Glasgow District:
North and Midlands:

19 November 1955

Edinburgh District	3 – 3	South
	Preview; Report

Murrayfield Stadium
Referee: Adam Austin (Glasgow HSFP)

Edinburgh District:
South:

=== Round 5 ===
3 December 1955

Glasgow District	3 – 3	Edinburgh District
	Preview; Report

Old Anniesland
Referee: G. Burrell (Gala)

Glasgow District:
Edinburgh District:
