= Norman Davidson (rugby union) =

Scotland sportsman (1931–2024)

- Born: James Norman Grieve Davidson; 28 January 1931 Hawick, Scottish Borders, Scotland
- Died: 1 September 2024 (aged 93) Orewa, Auckland, New Zealand
- School: Hawick High School
- University: University of Edinburgh; Loughborough University

Rugby union career
- Position: Fly-half
Amateur team(s)
Years	Team	Apps	(Points)
- Edinburgh University RFC
–	Loughborough Colleges		
Provincial / State sides
Years	Team	Apps	(Points)
- Edinburgh District
International career
Years	Team	Apps	(Points)
1952-1954	Scotland	7	(3)

James Norman Grieve Davidson (28 January 1931 – 1 September 2024) was a Scottish sportsman who represented Scotland in both cricket and rugby union. Davidson played first-class cricket for the Scotland national cricket team in 1951, and represented the Scotland national rugby union team from 1952 to 1954.

== Early life ==
Davidson was born on 28 January 1931 in Hawick. He attended Hawick High School, and went on to the University of Edinburgh, where he studied medicine.

== Cricket career ==
A right-handed batsman, Davidson made his debut for the Scottish cricket team in May 1951, against Warwickshire (an English county). Later in the year, he also played matches against Northamptonshire, Ireland, and Worcestershire, as well as a two-day game against the touring South Africans. All but the last of these matches were considered first-class.

== Rugby union career ==
=== Amateur career ===
Davidson played for Edinburgh University RFC when at University of Edinburgh.

=== Provincial career ===
He was selected for Edinburgh District and played in the Scottish Inter-District Championship. Playing in the inaugural 1953-54 season he was part of the Edinburgh side that won the title in that year.

=== International career ===
Davidson made his international debut on 12 January 1952 at Murrayfield in the Scotland vs France match. Of the seven matches he played for his national side he was never on the winning side. He played his final match for Scotland on 9 January 1954 at Murrayfield in the Scotland vs France match.

== Later life ==
After his sporting career, Davidson emigrated to New Zealand and worked as a doctor at Whangarei Hospital. He was awarded a Queen's Service Medal for public service in the 1995 New Year Honours.
