= Hamish Kemp =

Scotland international rugby union player

- Born: James William Young Kemp; 13 February 1933 Glasgow, Scotland
- Died: 5 June 2002 (aged 69) Glasgow, Scotland

Rugby union career
- Position: Lock
Amateur team(s)
Years	Team	Apps	(Points)
- Glasgow HSFP
Provincial / State sides
Years	Team	Apps	(Points)
- Glasgow District
International career
Years	Team	Apps	(Points)
1954-60	Scotland	27	

98th President of the Scottish Rugby Union
- In office 1984–1985
- Preceded by: Adam Robson
- Succeeded by: George Burrell

James William Young Kemp, known as Hamish Kemp, (13 February 1933 in Glasgow – 5 June 2002 in Glasgow) was a Scottish international rugby union player, who played at lock/second row.

== Rugby Union career ==
=== Amateur career ===
He played for Glasgow HSFP.

=== Provincial career ===
He played for Glasgow District in the Scottish Inter-District Championship. He won the title with Glasgow District in season 1955-56.

=== International career ===
He was capped twenty seven times for Scotland between 1954–1960.

=== Administrative career ===
He became the 98th President of the Scottish Rugby Union. He served the standard one year from 1984 to 1985.
