= Hutchesons' GSFP =

Scottish amateur rugby union club

Coordinates: 55.813933°N 4.309912°W

(Scotland) Hutchesons' GSFP
- Full name: Hutchesons' Grammar School Former Pupils Rugby Football Club
- Union: Scottish Rugby Union
- Founded: 1923
- Disbanded: 1990
- Location: Glasgow, Scotland
- Region: Glasgow
- Ground: Auldhouse
Team kit

Hutchesons' GSFP RFC was an amateur rugby union club in Glasgow, Scotland. The club no longer exists. In 1990, they merged with rivals Old Aloysians RFC to form Hutchesons Aloysians.

== History ==
Hutchesons' GSFP was formed in 1923, by former pupils of the school's rugby side. They, too, played out of Auldhouse at Eastwood, south of Glasgow near Thornliebank; which was Hutchesons' Grammar School's sports ground.

The Former Pupil side was admitted as a full member of the Scottish Rugby Union in 1937. They remained a 'closed side' only open to former 'Hutchie' pupils until 1971, when they decided to widen their catchment and become an 'open side' admitting all suitable players. Hutchesons' GSFP entered the new National League set up in the 1973–74 at 2nd Division level.

== Merger ==
It was noted at the end of season 1989-90 that Hutchesons and Old Aloysians were considering a merger. This was not without its detractors as The Glasgow Herald then noted: 'Some of the old boys of both Hutchie and Wally Dishes - as the Jesuit College in Garnethill was often less than affectionately known - are already convinced it is a bad idea.'

The SRU chief at the time, a former President of Hutchesons GSFP RFC, Jimmy McNeil, declared himself neutral on the merger. This was taken as tacit acceptance and the merger went through by 57 votes to 8 on Thursday 24 May 1990 at a Hutchesons GSFP EGM.

The Old Aloysians members had already approved the merger.

The new club Hutchesons Aloysians would take Hutchesons' GSFP's place in the league in Division 4 of the McEwan's National League for the coming 1990–91 season.

The Hutchesons' GSFP last games that season were at the Allan Glen's Sevens tournament in May 1990.

== Sevens ==
The club ran a Sevens tournament once in 1926. This was to raise funds for their ground. The tournament was played at Glasgow Academical's New Anniesland ground.

== Honours ==
- Renfrewshire Cup
  - Champions: 1987–88, 1988-89
- Kilmarnock Sevens
  - Champions: 1935, 1943, 1944, 1947
- Hyndland Sevens
  - Champions: 1964
- Clarkston Sevens
  - Champions: 1961
- Ayr Sevens
  - Champions: 1951
- Greenock Sevens
  - Champions: 1959

== Notable former players ==
=== Scotland internationalist ===
The following former Hutchesons' GSFP player has represented Scotland at full international level.

- (Scotland) Dick Allan

=== Notable non-Scottish players ===
The following is a list of notable non-Scottish international representative former Hutchesons' GSFP players:

USA

- (United States) Ray Nelson

=== Glasgow District ===
The following former Hutchesons' GSFP players have represented Glasgow District at provincial level.

- (Scotland) H. Roddan
- (Scotland) I. A. Green
- (Scotland) T. R. Graham
- (Scotland) S. J. Simcox
- (Scotland) C. W. L. Hodgson
- (Scotland) Dick Allan
- (Scotland) I. G. M. Gray
- (Scotland) J. M. Kerr
- (Scotland) W. G. Culver
