= Angus Cameron (rugby union) =

British Lions & Scotland international rugby union player

- Born: Angus Cameron; 24 June 1929 Glasgow, Scotland
- Died: 1 April 1991 (aged 61)
- Height: 1.81 m (5 ft 11 in)
- Notable relative(s): Donald Cameron, brother Rob McAlpine, great-nephew

Rugby union career
- Position: Fly half / Full Back
Amateur team(s)
Years	Team	Apps	(Points)
-	Glasgow HSFP		
Provincial / State sides
Years	Team	Apps	(Points)
-	Glasgow District		
-	Scotland Possibles		
International career
Years	Team	Apps	(Points)
1948-56	Scotland	17	(18)
1955	British and Irish Lions	2	(11)

Angus Cameron (24 June 1929 – 1 April 1991) was a Scottish international rugby union player who played for Glasgow HSFP and Glasgow District.

== Rugby Union career ==
=== Amateur career ===
He played for Glasgow HSFP.

=== Provincial career ===
He was selected for Glasgow District and played in the Scottish Inter-District Championship.

He played for the Scotland Possibles side in 1947.

=== International career ===
He was capped for Scotland seventeen times between 1948 and 1956.

He also took part in the 1955 British Lions tour to South Africa. He was named as vice-captain. He played in 2 tests against South Africa - and played in another 7 matches against provincial sides; resulting in a total of 9 appearances on the tour kicking 44 points.

== Family ==
His brother Donald was also capped for Scotland. Father to Elspeth and Angus. Grandfather to Cameron, Lorna and Angus.
