= University of St Andrews RFC =

Scottish rugby union club, based in Fife

(Scotland) University of St Andrews
- Full name: University of Saint Andrews Rugby Football Club
- Union: Rugby Football Union
- Nickname: Saints
- Founded: 1858; 168 years ago
- Ground(s): University Park, St. Andrews, Fife
- President: Chris Reekie
- Coach: David Morris
- Captain(s): Men: Thomas Whyte; Women: Isabel Hay
- League(s): Men: BUCS Premier 2 North; Women: BUCS Scottish 1A
Team kit

Official website
- rugby.wp.st-andrews.ac.uk

The University of St Andrews Rugby Football Club is an affiliated member of the University of St Andrews Athletic Union in Fife, Scotland. The club runs four men's and two women's teams, which play in the university leagues.

== History ==
It was founded in 1858, making it one of the oldest football clubs in the world. In 2008, the club celebrated its sesquicentennial year, marking its 150th anniversary.

The club is one of the founder members of the Scottish Rugby Union (SRU) and is often quoted as being the birthplace of 'running and passing' rugby, a distinct tactical advancement from the initial 'solo break/kick and chase' tactics which characterised the early years of the game's development.

The club's 1st XV play their home games at University Park, in the British Universities & Colleges Sport (BUCS) North Premier 2 North. In 2007, the 2nd XV were Scottish University Cup champions and currently play in BUCS Scottish Division 2A. In 2022, the 3rd XV won BUCS Scottish 4A, and a 4th XV was started for the first time.

On 24 March 2012 the 1st XV won the RBS Caledonia Division 2 Midlands title, beating Kinross 75–0 to lift the trophy. They were promoted to Caledonia League 1 three weeks later, beating Moray RFC, Caledonia 2 North Champions, 21–0.

In the 2013–14 season, they won BUCS 1A Scotland unbeaten, winning 9 games from 9. The 1st XV also defeated Edinburgh for the first time at the annual Varsity Match since it has been hosted at London Scottish's ground in Richmond.

In the 2014–15 season, having pulled out of the regional league system, they only competed in BUCS leagues. The 1st XV won BUCS 1A Scotland again.

In the 2021–22 season, the club were named Scottish University Sport Club of the Year after the men's 1st, 2nd and 3rd XVs all won their respective leagues. Notably the men's 1st XV also secured promotion to BUCS Premier 2 North and are currently on a two-game win streak in the Scottish Varsity Match against Edinburgh University.

== Sevens ==
The club run the St. Andrews University Sevens tournament held annually every April. This is the largest student run sevens event in the country.

== Notable former players ==
=== Men ===
St Andrews has produced 21 (Men's) international players: 19 for Scotland and 1 each for England and Ireland. Four of which have become British and Irish Lions: Tyrone Howe, Duncan Macrae, Chris Rea and Robert Stevenson. This means that St Andrews has produced more Scotland internationalists than any other Scottish university, bar Edinburgh.

Notably, St Andrews provided three players for the first ever rugby international:

- Robert Munro;
- Alfred Clunies-Ross; and
- J. S. Thomson.

Other subsequent international players include:

- Peter Anton
- David Bell
- Kim Elgie, capped for Scotland, and also for South Africa at cricket.
- Cameron Glasgow
- C. C. P. Hill/Colin Hill
- Damian Hopley represented England 1993 - 1995
- Rab Bruce Lockhart
- Jon Petrie
- Hamish Scott
- Ian Swan
- Alex Thomson
- (Scotland) David Whyte
- J. S. Wilson

=== Women ===
==== Scotland ====
The following former St. Andrews University RFC players have represented Scotland at senior international level.

- (Scotland) Annabel Sergeant
- (Scotland) Christianne Fahey

== Honours ==
=== Men ===
- The Scottish Varsity
  - Champions (8): 2013, 2014, 2015, 2016, 2021, 2022, 2024, 2026
- St. Andrews University Sevens
  - Champions (1): 1942
- Waid Academy F.P. Sevens
  - Champions (2): 1992, 1995
- Midlands District Sevens
  - Champions (5): 1929, 1954, 1958, 1963, 1965
