= Douglas Elliot =

Scotland international rugby union player

- Born: W. I. Douglas Elliot; 18 April 1923 Stow, Scotland
- Died: 12 March 2005 (aged 81) Melrose, Scotland

Rugby union career
- Position: Flanker
Amateur team(s)
Years	Team	Apps	(Points)
-	Edinburgh Academical		
Provincial / State sides
Years	Team	Apps	(Points)
-	Edinburgh District		
-	Cities District		
-	Scotland Probables		
International career
Years	Team	Apps	(Points)
1947–1954	Scotland	29	(6)
–	Barbarians		

Douglas Elliot (18 April 1923 – 12 March 2005) also known as W.I.D. Elliot and Doug(ie) Elliot was a Scottish international rugby union player, who played for Scotland.

He was six feet three inches and over fourteen stone. He was a backrow forward, and has also been inducted to the Scottish Sports Hall of Fame.

== Rugby Union career ==
=== Amateur career ===
Elliot played for Edinburgh Academicals.

=== Provincial career ===
He was capped by Edinburgh District to play Glasgow District in the inter-city match of 1947.

He was capped by Cities District in 1947 to play against Australia.

He played for the Scotland Probables side in December 1947.

=== International career ===
He was capped 29 times for Scotland between 1947 and 1954. He was never dropped, but did spend at least six matches away due to injuries including the whole 1953 seasons.

He was one of the few Scottish players of the period to escape untarnished after the 44–0 defeat by South Africa. Elliot was the only Scot to be named by the South African rugby correspondent R.K. Stent amongst the best players who had faced the 1951-2 Springbok tour to the British Isles.

Allan Massie talking of the 1950s, said:

"Elliot was my first Rugby hero, and for a long time in the Fifties, he was the only one a Scots boy could have... the Scottish sides he played in, especially in the Fifties, gave him little chance to display his attacking abilities. All the same, match reports of the time make frequent mention of Elliot bursting from the line-out to run thirty yards... He was undoubtedly the nearest thing to a forward in the classic All Black mould that Scotland produced in the twenty years after the war, for he was fast also, possessed all the basic skills, and breathed aggression. It was fitting that almost his last game for Scotland was against the All Blacks in 1954, when he captained the side that held the tourists to a single penalty goal."

Bill McLaren remembers in 1947 going for a Scotland trial, and playing at the back of the line-out,

"the only time the ball was thrown anywhere near there and I got it I found myself enmeshed in a vice-like grip. The feeling was of two iron bands imprisoning my arms. The bands belonging to Douglas Elliot, one of the greatest Scottish wing-forwards, whose strength had been developed in his every-day life as a son of the soil. I was much impressed by the form of temporary paralysis he imposed on my arms and it did not surprise me that he remained Scotland's most capped wing-forward with 29 appearances until John Jeffrey gained his 30th cap in the second Test against the All Blacks in Auckland in June 1990."

== Farming career ==
Elliot was invited to play with the British and Irish Lions, but could not afford to spend six months away from his farm; his offer to pay for his flights (the Lions generally went by boat in those days.)

The amateur era was quite different, in both ethos and time, but as Elliot once told Bill McLaren, farmwork could take a lot of time too:

"prior to one Scottish game against Wales at Murrayfield he had attended a brief Scottish team get-together on the Friday afternoon but, as his father was not well, Douglas drove back home to the family farm some way out of Edinburgh and the car ran out of petrol four miles from home. He ran all the way home for the petrol and back to the car, did some shearing and some other farmwork before dark, was up with the lark because a field drain had to be repaired which took two hours, then took off for Murrayfield to join the Scottish team just in time for kick-off. What is more, Scotland won!"

McLaren says when selecting his all-time Scotland XV that "I believe, for instance, that Douglas Elliot (Edinburgh Academicals)... would still have made massive impact in the modern game although it might have irked him not a little that he would have to give far more of his time from farming to attend so many squad sessions."
