= Adam Austin (referee) =

Scottish rugby referee (c.1911–c.1970)

- Born: Adam Wightman Clark Austin c. 1911 Lenzie, Scotland
- Died: c. January 1970 Lanarkshire, Scotland
- Occupation: Rugby union referee

Rugby union career
Amateur team(s)
Years	Team	Apps	(Points)
-	Glasgow HSFP		
Refereeing career
Years	Competition		Apps
1952 - 54	Five Natrions Championship		3
1953 - 55	Scottish Inter-District Championship		

Adam Austin (1911–1970) is a former rugby union international referee who represented the Scottish Rugby Union. He was involved in many sports: rugby union, golf, curling and bowling, the most notable.

== Rugby union career ==
=== Playing career ===
==== Amateur career ====
Austin went to Glasgow High School where he availed himself of many sports.

Austin played for Glasgow HSFP.

=== Referee career ===
==== Professional career ====
He refereed the Glasgow University Sevens tournament in 1947.

He refereed the first Scottish Inter-District Championship match in 1953. It was the Edinburgh District v South match on 30 September.

He became a selector on the Glasgow and District committee.

==== International career ====
He refereed the Ireland v England match in the Five Nations on 14 February 1953.

== Curling career ==
He was President of Bellshill Curling Club from 1967–68.

== Cricket career ==
He played cricket for Greenock Cricket Club.

== Golf career ==
Noted as a golfer of some note, Austin latterly became a golf official.

== Outside of sport ==
Austin moved to Motherwell in 1955.

Austin was employed by the Royal Bank of Scotland: in the Hamilton branch, then as an accountant in the Wishaw branch; then as manager of the Motherwell branch.

He joined the local Motherwell and Bellshill Rotary Club in 1964, becoming its secretary in 1968.

His death was announced to the Rotary Club members on 8 January 1970.

== Family ==
A plane crash on a German motorway made the headlines in 1968. A British Eagle Viscount airliner crashed onto an autobahn killing 48 people. Amongst the dead were Austin's son and daughter in law, Robin and Linda Austin, who were travelling through southern Germany.

Another son, Douglas, joined the Royal Bank of Scotland in Edinburgh, as an accountant.
