= North of Scotland District (rugby union) =

Scottish district rugby union team

North of Scotland
- Full name: North of Scotland District
- Founded: 1881; 145 years ago

North of Scotland was a select provincial amateur rugby union team that drew its players mainly from north of Scotland, roughly corresponding from around Aberdeenshire west and northwards.

Confusingly the name North of Scotland was also used for a larger 'combined district' of the North of Scotland District and the Midlands District.

This lack of recognition for the Midlands District, when the 'North of Scotland' name was used for the combined side, was finally ended in 1978. After this the 'combined district' became known as North and Midlands, although the 'North and Midlands' name was used from 1954 in the Scottish Inter-District Championship.

The name of North of Scotland was then only used for the Aberdeenshire and Highland district.

== Formation ==
A North v Midlands match took place on 17 December 1881.

A North v South trial match was played on 31 December 1881.

The North v South match did come off on 30 December 1882; the North winning by 1 try to nil.

A North v South trial match was arranged for 22 December 1883 but did not come of; but a North team was selected for a match on 29 December 1883.

Another North v South fixture was arranged the following year - but again this match failed to come off. Reports of this deemed the annual fixture a 'fiasco'; the Dundee Courier noting: "Whatever may have kept the majority of the South men and the St. Andrews men of the North from putting in an appearance, it is questionable whether the Union will care about putting on another meeting which to a portion of those interested seems of so little importance."

The North of Scotland District was originally formed as the Scottish Northern Counties Football Union in 1887.

Players were capped by their District; they received a cap.

== North of Scotland as a separate province ==
The North of Scotland side was traditionally made up from Aberdeenshire and Highland players.

In many instances, especially against touring teams, the North of Scotland District side contained Midlands District players.

=== North of Scotland trial matches ===
Trial matches for selection to the North of Scotland District side were initially a Reds versus Colours match.

Later the Aberdeenshire and Highland sides would play trial matches to gain selection to the separate North of Scotland side.

=== North v Midlands ===
Often, the Midland and North Districts played in a trial match against one another to determine selection for the combined North of Scotland side.

- North v Midlands

== North of Scotland as a combined province ==
Usually the North of Scotland played as a de facto combined side, selecting players not only from the North of Scotland but also those from Midlands District.

- North v South 14 December 1912 match report

Historically the combined North of Scotland team played matches against touring teams visiting Scotland from abroad, and also competed in the first season of the Scottish Inter-District Championship in 1953-54.

=== 1953-54 Scottish Inter-District Championship ===
This season was the last domestic season where the Midlands received no recognition for their input into the combined North of Scotland side.

After the start of the Scottish Inter-District Championship in 1953-54 season, the Midlands District complained to the Scottish Rugby Union that the North of Scotland District side which competed in that first championship had several Midlands players in its squad and that the Midlands should receive equal recognition for providing their players to the North of Scotland District team. The SRU agreed and the combined team became formally known as North and Midlands in subsequent seasons for the domestic tournament.

=== Touring sides ===
However against touring sides the name North and Midlands was not used for the combined side until 1978.

=== North and Midlands ===
The new name of North and Midlands was used for the combined side from 1954 season onwards in the domestic Scottish Inter-District Championship. From 1978 till professionalism in 1996 the North and Midlands name was also used against touring sides.

=== Caledonia Reds ===
The amateur North and Midlands side evolved into the professional Caledonia Reds side in 1996; one year after rugby union allowed professionalism in 1995.

== Honours ==
The 'combined' North side only formally played in the inaugural season of the Scottish Inter-District Championship; the 1953-54 season. In subsequent seasons the 'combined' side was formally named North and Midlands.

=== Season standings ===
Scottish Inter-District Championship

Season	Pos	Pld	W	D	L	F	A	+/-	BP	Pts	Notes
1953–54	4th	3	0	0	3	28	88	-60	-	0	

== Partial list of games played against international opposition ==
These matches are in respect of the 'combined' North side.

For international matches from 1978 onwards, see North and Midlands.

Year	Date	Opponent	Venue	Result	Score	Tour
1902	29 December	Canada	Dundee	Loss	0-5	Report
1906	20 November	South Africa	Aberdeen	Loss	3-35	1906–07 South Africa rugby union tour Report
1932	9 January	South Africa	Pittodrie Stadium, Aberdeen	Loss	0-9	1931–32 South Africa rugby union tour Report
1935	27 November	New Zealand	Pittodrie Stadium, Aberdeen	Loss	6-12	1935–36 New Zealand rugby union tour of Britain, Ireland and Canada
1947	8 October	Australia	Linksfield Stadium, Aberdeen	Loss	0-14	1947–48 Australia rugby union tour of Britain, Ireland, France and North America
1951	28 November	South Africa	Linksfield Stadium, Aberdeen	Loss	3-14	1951–52 South Africa rugby union tour
1953	2 December	New Zealand	Linksfield Stadium, Aberdeen	Loss	3-28	1953–54 New Zealand rugby union tour of Britain, Ireland, France and North America
1958	11 February 1958	Australia	Linksfield Stadium, Aberdeen	Loss	3-6	1957–58 Australia rugby union tour of Britain, Ireland and France
1961	25 January	South Africa	Linksfield Stadium, Aberdeen	Loss	9-22	1960–61 South Africa rugby union tour of Europe Report
1964	14 January	New Zealand	Linksfield Stadium, Aberdeen	Loss	3-15	1963–64 New Zealand rugby union tour of Britain, Ireland, France and North America
1966	13 December	Australia	Linksfield Stadium, Aberdeen	Loss	3-6	1966–67 Australia rugby union tour of Britain, Ireland and France Report
1969	2 December	South Africa	Aberdeen	Loss	3-37	1969–70 South Africa rugby union tour of Britain and Ireland Preview Report
1973	20 November	Argentina	Aberdeen	Loss	23-28	1973 Argentina rugby union tour of Ireland and Scotland Report

== Notable former players ==
=== Notable non-Scottish players ===
The following is a list of notable non-Scottish international representative former North of Scotland (combined side) players:

Ireland

- (Ireland) Mark Sugden

== See also ==
- Midlands District
- North and Midlands
- Caledonia Reds
