= 1906–07 Scottish Districts season =

Rugby union competition

- Countries: Scotland
- Date: 1906–07
- Matches played: 1

The 1906–07 Scottish Districts season is a record of all the rugby union matches for Scotland's district teams.

== History ==
Glasgow District and Edinburgh District drew nil-nil in the Inter-City match.

== Results ==
Date	Try	Conversion	Penalty	Dropped goal	Goal from mark	Notes
1905–1947	3 points	2 points	3 points	4 points	3 points	

=== Inter-City ===
1 December 1906

Glasgow District	0–0	Edinburgh District
	Report; Report

Hamilton Crescent, Glasgow
Referee: Adam Turnbull (Hawick)

Glasgow District: H. A. Spencer (Glasgow HSFP), William Campbell Church (Glasgow Academicals), J. A. Findlay (Kelvinside Academicals), Tennant Sloan (Glasgow Academicals), Jimmy Dobson (Glasgow Academicals), A. Carr Frame (Glasgow Academicals), A. H. Gallie (Glasgow Academicals), William Patrick Scott (West of Scotland), William Thomson (West of Scotland), W. C. Currie (West of Scotland), George Frew (Glasgow HSFP), R. M. Mather (Clydesdale), R. W. Cassels (Kelvinside Academicals), R. B. Waddell (Glasgow Academicals), H. G. Wilson (Glasgow University)
Edinburgh District: John Simson (Edinburgh University), H. J. Scougal (Watsonians), John Forbes (Watsonians), J. M. McKeand (Edinburgh Academicals), A. D. Anderson (Edinburgh Academicals), D. Cotterill (Edinburgh Academicals), J. B. Stewart (Institution), David Bedell-Sivright (Edinburgh University), James MacKenzie (Edinburgh University), Jock Scott (Edinburgh Academicals), J. French (Institution), George Sanderson (Royal HSFP), J. M. Usher (Edinburgh Wanderers), Louis Moritz Speirs (Watsonians), John MacCallum (Watsonians)

=== Other Scottish matches ===
8 December 1906

North of Scotland District	5–3	South-Western District
Try: J. E. McIntyre; Con: Douglas Nicoll	Report	Try: J. B. Walker

North Inch, Perth
Referee: J. D. Dallas (SRU)

North of Scotland District: C. Rennie (Panmure), M. Williamson (Aberdeen GSFP), P. Watson (Panmure), M. Nicoll (Panmure), J. Ovenstone (Panmure), J. E. McIntyre [captain] (Panmure), C. F. Aitken (Kirkcaldy), D. Nicoll (Panmure), D. M. Mitchell (Panmure), H. Fullerton (Panmure), G. Kirkby (Kirkcaldy), J. Scott (Perthshire), P. Black (Dundee HSFP), H. Mill (Aberdeen University), J. Pope (Aberdeen GSFP)
South Western District: S. Hendry (Bearsden), A. McPherson (Ayr), W. Lang (Greenock Wanderers), J. J. Ramsay (Greenock Wanderers), J. L. C. Gudgeon (Ayr), James Reid Kerr [captain] (Greenock Wanderers), J. McFadzean (Ayr), F. Lyle (Greenock Wanderers), R. S. Smith (Lenzie), C. J. McIntyre (Greenock Wanderers), A. J. Gray (Ayr), A. Drew (Craigielea), T. R.C. Clough (Ayr)

22 December 1906

South of Scotland District	0–32	Anglo-Scots
	Report	Try: Geddes; Moir; Munro × 2 Purves; Walker; Gowland; Con: Geddes × 4 Pen: Simson

The Greenyards, Melrose
Attendance: c.1800
Referee: John Tulloch

South of Scotland: J. T. Robson (Jed-Forest), D. Brown (Gala), G. S. Scott (Gala), Shannon (Hawick), W. Drummond (Melrose), W. McCrirrick (Gala), Renilson (Jed-Forest), J. Arthur (Gala), J. Aitchison (Gala), W. Jardine (Jed-Forest), J. Scott (Langholm), W. McVitie (Langholm), G. Johnstone (Hawick), J. E. Fairbairn (Melrose), Wight (Jed-Forest)
Anglo-Scots: Douglas Schulze (London Scottish), Alex Purves (London Scottish), Maurie Walter (London Scottish), George Cunningham (London Scottish), D. F. Moir (United Services), Ernest Simson (London Scottish), Patrick Munro (London Scottish), Irvine Geddes (London Scottish), J. R. Simson (London Scottish), Geoffrey Gowlland (London Scottish), D. A. Hutchinson (London Scottish), J. D. Young (London Scottish), H. Munro (London Scottish), T. S. Jobson (Sandhurst), W. P. Cowper (London Scottish)

12 January 1907

Cities	9–21	Provinces
Try: Sanderson; Con: McCallum; Drop: Forbes	Report	Try: Abercrombie; Walter; McGregor; Noble × 2 Con: Geddes × 3

Inverleith
Attendance: 3,000
Referee: John Tulloch (SRU)

Cities: G. H. Urquhart (Royal HSFP), H. J. Scougal (Watsonians), George Cunningham (London Scottish), J. L. Forbes (Watsonians), J. Douglas Brown (Gala), A. C. Frame (Glasgow Academicals), J. B. Stewart (Institution), J. C. McCallum (Watsonians), Louis Moritz Speirs (Watsonians), William Thomson (West of Scotland), J. M. McKenzie (Edinburgh University), J. French (Institute), R. B. Waddell (Glasgow Academicals), George Sanderson (Royal HSFP), Jock Scott (Edinburgh Academicals)

Provinces: D. G. Schulze (London Scottish), D. F. Moir (United Services), D. G. McGregor (Pontypridd and Watsonians), M. W. Walter (London Scottish), A. L. Purves (London Scottish), P. L. H. Noble (United Services), J. E. McIntyre (Panmure), L. C. Geddes (London Scottish), H. G. Monteith (London Scottish), H. Milne (Aberdeen University), Cecil Abercrombie (United Services), W. B. Jardine (Jed-Forest), G. C. Gowland (London Scottish), J. D. Young (London Scottish), J. W. Alexander (Cambridge University)

=== English matches ===
No other District matches played.

=== International matches ===
No touring matches this season.
