= 1907–08 Scottish Districts season =

Rugby union competition

- Countries: Scotland
- Date: 1907–08
- Matches played: 1

The 1907–08 Scottish Districts season is a record of all the rugby union matches for Scotland's district teams.

== History ==
Glasgow District and Edinburgh District drew nil-nil in the Inter-City match for the second year in a row.

The SRU founded a new match this year. Instead of the Anglo-Scots playing South of Scotland, the Anglo-Scots were to play against a 'Provinces' District. To represent the Provinces, players were selected from clubs outwith Glasgow and Edinburgh. As such they were deemed provincial. The Provinces District was the counterpart to the very occasional Glasgow-Edinburgh (or 'Cities') representative side.

The 1907-8 trials are as follows: "November 16— South-West v North of Scotland, in the south-west. November 30 South v. North and South-West (combined), in the south. December 7 — Glasgow v. Edinburgh, at Glasgow. December 21 — Provinces v. Anglo-Scots, at Inverleith. January 11 — Cities v Rest of Scotland, at Inverleith. Feb 29 Glasgow v. Edinburgh, at Glasgow.

== Results ==
Date	Try	Conversion	Penalty	Dropped goal	Goal from mark	Notes
1905–1947	3 points	2 points	3 points	4 points	3 points	

=== Inter-City ===
7 December 1907

Glasgow District	0 - 0	Edinburgh District
	Report

Hamilton Crescent, Glasgow

Glasgow District:
Edinburgh District:

=== Other Scottish matches ===
16 November 1907

South-West	-	North of Scotland District
	Report

Greenock
Referee: John Tulloch (SRU)

South-West:
North of Scotland District:

21 December 1907

Provinces District	3 - 15	Anglo-Scots
	Report

Inverleith
Referee: Andrew Flett

Provinces:
Anglo-Scots:

11 January 1908

Cities District	6 - 15	Provinces District
	Report

Inverleith
Referee: Andrew Flett

Cities:
Provinces:

=== English matches ===
No other District matches played.

=== International matches ===
No touring matches this season.
