= Leonard West (rugby union) =

Scotland international rugby union player

- Born: Leonard West; 31 May 1879 Allerton, England
- Died: 26 January 1945 (aged 65) Hoddesdon, England

Rugby union career
- Position: Forward
Amateur team(s)
Years	Team	Apps	(Points)
1903	Edinburgh University		
- Carlisle
- London Scottish
- West Hartlepool
Provincial / State sides
Years	Team	Apps	(Points)
1902	Edinburgh District		
1903	Cities District		
1904	Anglo-Scots		
International career
Years	Team	Apps	(Points)
1903-06	Scotland	9	(0)

Leonard West (31 May 1879 – 26 January 1945) was a Scottish international rugby union player.

== Rugby Union career ==
=== Amateur career ===
He played for Edinburgh University.

He played for Carlisle.

He played for London Scottish.

He played for West Hartlepool.

=== Provincial career ===
He represented Edinburgh District in December 1902 against Glasgow District in the inter-city match.

He played for Cities District in January 1903 against Provinces District.

While with Carlisle, he turned out for Anglo-Scots on 24 December 1904.

=== International career ===
He received 9 caps for Scotland.

== Medical career ==
He obtained his medical degree from Edinburgh University in 1903.

== Family ==
He was the son of Thomas Edward West (1833–1901). Thomas was a barrister at law.

His mother was Mary Cordelia Parrinton (1844–1908).
