= Douglas Schulze =

Scotland international rugby union player

- Born: Douglas Gordon Schulze; 5 March 1881 Glasgow, Scotland
- Died: 17 May 1956 (aged 75)
- School: Fettes College

Rugby union career
- Position: Full Back
Youth career
- Glasgow Academicals
- Fettes College
Amateur team(s)
Years	Team	Apps	(Points)
- Edinburgh Wanderers
- Oxford University
- Manchester University
- London Scottish
- Dartmouth Naval College
- Northampton Saints
Provincial / State sides
Years	Team	Apps	(Points)
1904-06	Anglo-Scots		
1904	Northern Universities		
1907-09	Provinces District		
International career
Years	Team	Apps	(Points)
1905-11	Scotland	13	(4)

Douglas Schulze (5 March 1881 – 17 May 1956) was a Scotland international rugby union player. He played as a Full Back. After his rugby career, he became a teacher and was appointed headmaster of Kelvinside Academy in 1913.

== Rugby Union career ==
=== Amateur career ===
He initially played for Glasgow Academicals and Fettes College at school and then played for Edinburgh Wanderers.

Schulze played for Oxford University when he moved to study there.

In 1904 he was listed as playing for Manchester. This was the university side. He moved there to study to become a teacher.

He then played for London Scottish, Dartmouth Naval College and Northampton Saints.

=== Provincial career ===
He played for Anglo-Scots against South of Scotland District on 24 December 1904. He was hailed as the Scottish Find of the season, by the Illustrated Police News, seemingly oblivious to Schulze's Scottish roots:

A Scottish Find. D. G. Schulze, the Manchester back, is being hailed as the find the Scottish trial season, and the critics north of the Tweed are beginning to regard him as possible International candidate. Schulze’s Scottish qualifications may or may not consist solely of his Fettes connection, but at all events at that famous nursery of the game he played back in a team which contained the elder Sivright and L. M. McLeod.

While in Manchester, he played for Northern Universities.

He played for Anglo-Scots against South of Scotland District on 22 December 1906.

He played for Provinces District against Cities District on 12 January 1907.

He played for Provinces District against Cities District on 16 January 1909.

=== International career ===
Schulze was capped 13 times for Scotland from 1905 to 1911.

== Teaching career ==
From The Scotsman of 31 March 1913:

NEW HEADMASTER FOR KELVINSIDE ACADEMY, Glasgow.
Mr Douglas Schulze has received the appointment of rector and headmaster of Kelvinside Academy, Glasgow, in succession to Mr W. Cecil Laming, who will leave at the end of June. Born in Glasgow, and educated till twelve years of age at Glasgow Academy, Mr Schulze was then for seven years at Fettes College, and attained the position of head boy of his house. From Fettes he proceeded to Oxford, and after taking his degree went for a year's study of education to Manchester University, where he took the teaching diploma. He began permanent teaching work at the Royal Naval College in Dartmouth, joining the civilian staff as history and English master. After two years' service in Dartmouth, he was for a year at Christ College, Brecon taking the sixth form, and was then appointed assistant master and house tutor at Uppingham, where he remained for four years. He was a member of Oxford University Rugby football team, and played for Scotland, with the exception of one year, from 1905 to 1911. Mr Schulze will enter on his duties at Kelvinside in the beginning of September.

== Family ==
His father was Adolph Schulze (1840–1891) and his mother was Johanna Miller (1851–1936). Adolph Schulze was from Crimmitschau, in Germany - but, at the time of Adolph's life, the town was in the Kingdom of Saxony. Johanna Miller was from the Gorbals in Glasgow.

Douglas had 3 brothers: Adolph, Hermann and Charles: and 2 sisters: Irene and Helen. Charles played rugby for Glasgow Academicals.
