= 1900–01 Scottish Districts season =

Rugby union competition

- Countries: Scotland
- Date: 1900–01
- Matches played: 1

The 1900–01 Scottish Districts season is a record of all the rugby union matches for Scotland's district teams.

== History ==
Edinburgh District beat Glasgow District in the Inter-City match. It was marked as a poor turnout; as the Edinburgh public had their fill of exciting rugby union matches recently. The poor weather didn't aid the turnout, and the North British Mail newspaper wondered how few the Inter-City turnout might have been, had not two trains full of Glasgow District fans made the journey east.

== Results ==
| Date | Try | Conversion | Penalty | Dropped goal | Goal from mark | Notes |
|---|---|---|---|---|---|---|
| 1894–1904 | 3 points | 2 points | 3 points | 4 points | 4 points | |

=== Inter-City ===
1 December 1900

| Glasgow District | 0 - 2 goals, 3 tries | Edinburgh District |
| | Report |

Inverleith, Edinburgh
Attendance: 3,000
Referee: Adam Turnbull

Glasgow District:
Edinburgh District:

=== Other Scottish matches ===
17 November 1900

| North of Scotland District | v | South-West District |
| | Preview |

Inverleith

North of Scotland:
South-West District:

22 December 1900

| South of Scotland District | 3 - 9 | Anglo-Scots |
| | Report |

Hawick

South of Scotland:
Anglo-Scots:

12 January 1901

| Cities District | 35 - 0 | Provinces District |
| | Report |

Hamilton Crescent
Attendance: 6,000
Referee: James Aikman Smith

Cities: A. W. Duncan (Edinburgh University); A. N. Fell (Edinburgh University), Phipps Turnbull (Edinburgh Academicals), John Tulloch (Kelvinside Academicals). W. H. Welsh (Edinburgh University); L. Greig (Glasgow Academicals), J. I. Gillespie (Edinburgh Academieals); M. C. Morrison (R.H.S.), J. M. Dykes (G.H.S.), R. S. Stronach (Glasgow Academicals), A. Frew, A. B. Flett (Edinburgh University), J. A. Bell (Clydesdale), W. P. Scott (West of Scotland), W. P. Dods (Edinburgh Academicals)
Provinces: W. Wilson (London Scottish); J. E. Crabbie (Oxford), H. A. Ross (London Scottish), J. Paterson (Hawick), G. O. Gould (Aberdeen Grammar School); J. Knox (Skipton), J. Middleton (London Scottish); D. R. Bedell-Sivright (Cambridge), J. Ross (London Scottish), W. Kyle (Hawick), J. G. Graham (Liverpool Old Boys), A. Mann (Stewart's College) F. C. Swanston, A. G. Cairns (Oxford), T. D. Murray (Panmure)

=== English matches ===
No other District matches played.

=== International matches ===
No touring matches this season.
