= Tom Elliot (rugby union, born 1880) =

Scotland international rugby union player

- Born: Thomas Mair Elliot; 10 April 1880 Galashiels, Scotland
- Died: 28 November 1948 (aged 68) Forest Row, England

Rugby union career
- Position: Wing
Amateur team(s)
Years	Team	Apps	(Points)
1899 - 1909	Gala		
Provincial / State sides
Years	Team	Apps	(Points)
-	South of Scotland		
-	Provinces District		
International career
Years	Team	Apps	(Points)
1905	Scotland	1	(0)

Tom Elliot (10 April 1880 – 28 November 1948) was a Scotland international rugby union player.

== Rugby Union career ==
=== Amateur career ===
Elliot played for Gala, first playing for the club in 1899.

The Gala 7s side, including Elliot, got to the Hawick Sevens final of 1904, but Hawick beat them in the final. The Hawick News and Border Chronicle of 22 April 1904 noting:

That Gala were kept mostly on the defensive; and Tom Elliot did not get much chance of a sprint.

As runners up, the Gala players were given kit bags.

The Gala XV side won the Border League in 1905.

Elliot was a mainstay in the Gala side until 1909.

=== Provincial career ===
He was capped by South of Scotland District. He did not make the side in their 23 December 1905 match against the Anglo-Scots and J. Bunyan of Melrose had to take his place.

He captained the side in their match against South Africa in 1906. W. E. Kyle was chosen captain when the side was first announced, but Kyle could not play.

He played for Provinces District in the 14 January trial match of 1905.

=== International career ===
He was capped by Scotland only the once, in 1905, in the match against England.

== Family ==
He was born to William Elliot (1840-1909) and Ann Mair (1843-1921). He was one of their 9 children. He married Gladys Maude Benstead on 28 October 1924 in Surrey.
