= 1902–03 Scottish Districts season =

Rugby union competition

- Countries: Scotland
- Date: 1902–03
- Matches played: 1

The 1902–03 Scottish Districts season is a record of all the rugby union matches for Scotland's district teams.

== History ==
Edinburgh District and Glasgow District drew nil-nil in the Inter-City match.

== Results ==
| Date | Try | Conversion | Penalty | Dropped goal | Goal from mark | Notes |
|---|---|---|---|---|---|---|
| 1894–1904 | 3 points | 2 points | 3 points | 4 points | 4 points | |

=== Inter-City ===
13 December 1902

| Glasgow District | 0 - 0 | Edinburgh District |
| | Report |

Hamilton Crescent, Glasgow

Glasgow District:
Edinburgh District:

=== Other Scottish matches ===
20 December 1902

| North of Scotland District | 5 - 3 | South-Western District |
| | Preview; Report |

High School Recreation Grounds, Dundee

North of Scotland:
South-Western District:

27 December 1902

| South of Scotland District | 13 - 0 | Anglo-Scots |
| | Report; Report |

Inverleith, Edinburgh

South of Scotland:
Anglo-Scots:

24 January 1903

| Cities District | - | Provinces District |
| | Report |

Inverleith, Edinburgh

Cities District:
Provinces District:

=== English matches ===
No other District matches played.

=== International matches ===
20 December 1902

| Glasgow District | 11 - 3 | Canada |
| | Preview; Report |

Hamilton Crescent, Glasgow
Referee: Andrew Flett (Edinburgh University)

Glasgow District:
Canada:

29 December 1902

| North of Scotland District | 0 - 5 | Canada |
| | Report |

High School Recreation Ground, Dundee

North of Scotland District:
Canada:
