= James Aikman Smith =

Scottish rugby union player and executive (1859–1931)

- Born: James Aikman Smith; 5 March 1859 Edinburgh, Scotland
- Died: 6 February 1931 (aged 71) Stafford, England

Rugby union career
Amateur team(s)
Years	Team	Apps	(Points)
-	Royal HSFP		
Refereeing career
Years	Competition		Apps
1892-95	Home Nations Championship		3
- Scottish Unofficial Championship
1901	Scottish Districts		

47th President of the Scottish Rugby Union
- In office 1926–1927
- Preceded by: Robin Welsh
- Succeeded by: Macbeth Duncan

James Aikman Smith (1859–1931) was a Scottish rugby union player and later became an international referee. He became the 47th President of the Scottish Rugby Union.

== Rugby Union career ==
=== Amateur career ===
Smith played for Royal HSFP.

=== Referee career ===
Smith refereed internationally in the Home Nations Championship. He refereed the England versus Ireland match in 1892; the England versus Wales match in 1894 and the Wales versus England match in 1895.

He refereed an Oxford University versus Edinburgh Wanderers match in 1896.

He refereed in the Scottish Unofficial Championship.

Smith was invited to referee the Northumberland versus Durham match in 1896 and 1897.

An indication of how much a stickler for the rules Smith was, is found in the aftermath of a match he refereed between Gala and Hunslet, an English side from Yorkshire, in late 1893. The Scottish Rugby Union had ruled that shinguards must be worn by the players for safety. Other unions had not made shinguards compulsory. Furthermore, the SRU rule stated that shinguards should be worn outside the sock, presumably to aid policing of the new rule. Hunslet refused to comply with this; and Smith and the SRU then complained to the English Union. The SRU attested that the captain of Hunslet was guilty of misconduct on two points:- for the shinguards situation; and for complaining to the referee when Smith had chalked off a try for offside during the match itself.

The Yorkshire Rugby Union heard about this complaint in early 1894 and conducted their own investigation. The SRU rulechange came into effect the day before the match and was evidently problematic for the visiting English side. Nevertheless, Hunslet claimed that their players were wearing shinguards inside their socks. On questioning this the Yorkshire Union found that Hunslet had banned the players wearing shinguards outside their socks as one of their players was injured before when the buckle holding the shinguard on the sock was driven into a player's leg by a kick thus injuring him. In addition, the Yorkshire Union thought it heavy handed to complain directly to the national union when the complaint could have been made to the District Union in the first instance. As for the second point on the disallowed try Hunslet felt that the referee was not sympathetic in the way that Yorkshire teams played. Nevertheless, they had to provide representatives to the English national union so that the complaint was heard.

One year later in 1895, the Hunslet club broke away from rugby union and one was on the 21 clubs that formed the Northern Union and became a rugby league club.

=== Administrative career ===
He was on the committee of the Scottish Rugby Union for over 40 years. He took part in the acquisition of Murrayfield Stadium. He joined the committee in 1887, became Honorary Secretary and Treasurer in 1890. He remained Treasurer till 1910 when Andrew Flett took over. Flett was killed in the war in 1914 and Smith had to resume both roles again till 1919.

Such was his influence on the Scottish Rugby Union that Smith came in for ' a heap of abuse' in not protecting the Inverlieth pitch with straw prior to the 1899 Scotland versus Wales match.

He was President of the Scottish Rugby Union for the period 1926 to 1927.

After this Smith remained on the board of the Scottish Rugby Union as chairman of the executive committee.

Smith was a stickler to keep rugby union an amateur sport. He was called 'the autocrat of Scottish rugby' and the 'High Priest of Amateurism' and even the 'Napoleon of Rugby' and his name was known worldwide. The Napoleon epitaph fitted with the former SRU committee member and journalist known as Touch Judge on the Dundee Courier: he described Smith as a 'small grey man' who held court in every committee:

Of all the meetings as such I have no clear recollections save of this small alert man. There were several notable chairman in all those years - Alexander Blair, Charles Fleming, William Andrew Walls, John Dallas, James Greenlees - all big men but the figure which dominated every meeting was that of the small man who sat at the chairman's left hand.

In 1928, King George V asked Smith why Scotland were not wearing numbers on their backs. Smith replied: "This sir is a rugby match not a cattle sale."

== Outside of rugby ==
He was a Chartered Accountant.

== Death ==
Smith was travelling on the train with the Scotland team for the international match with Wales in Cardiff in 1931. He became seriously ill and he was taken to a hospital in Stafford. He died soon after his admission. Only a day before he seemed in the best of health when he attended the funeral of Andrew Balfour.

The value of his estate was given as £110, 663 and 4 shillings and 8d.
