= Andrew Lindsay (rugby union) =

Scotland international rugby union player

- Born: Andrew Alexander Bonar Lindsay; 19 July 1885 Herbert, New Zealand
- Died: 15 May 1970 (aged 84) Auckland, New Zealand

Rugby union career
- Position: Scrum half
Amateur team(s)
Years	Team	Apps	(Points)
- Royal London Hospital
- United Services
- London Scottish
Provincial / State sides
Years	Team	Apps	(Points)
- Anglo-Scots
- Provinces District
International career
Years	Team	Apps	(Points)
1910-11	Scotland	2	(0)

Andrew Lindsay (19 July 1885 – 15 May 1970) was a Scotland international rugby union player.

== Rugby Union career ==
=== Amateur career ===
He played for the Royal London Hospital rugby union club.

He also played for United Services.

He played for London Scottish before the outbreak of the First World War.

=== Provincial career ===
He was capped by Anglo-Scots in 1909.

He was capped by Provinces District to play against Cities District in January 1910.

=== International career ===
Lindsay was capped by Scotland twice, in the period 1910 to 1911.

== Medical career ==
He was a doctor and became medical officer of the Indian Tea Association.

During the evacuation of Burma, so many thousands of refugees came to the hills of the tea planting association that they had to build camps for them.

The Daily Herald newspaper of 22 December 1943 pieced together the story:

In early 1942, when the Japs were racing into Burma, the tea industry was called on to help build aerodromes and strategic roads in Assam. So the men who provided you with your cup of tea buckled to. One European was put in charge of every 500 native labourers. Malaria risks were so great that the men worked for two months at a time, each batch then going back to the comparative comfort of the tea gardens while thie relief took over. Then the refugees came, fleeing from Burma. Men and women of many nationalities died on the way. Corpses piled up on the side of the jungle tracks. Vultures wheeled in the skies. It yet another job for the planters, their wives, tea garden labourers, tribesmen. " There are 70,000 coming.' they were told one minute. " There are 250,000 on the way." they were told the next minute. So they went to work in the wild Naga Hills, up in the 4,000 ft. high Hukawng Valley, in the Chaukan Pass 8,000 ft. up. Europeans had never passed through some of the country before. Head-hunters lurked the dark jungle. Dacoits were busy - killing, plundering. Camps were built and manned by white men and women. Elephants toiled up crazy precipice paths carrying quinine, bandages. Rafts were strung together from logs and thatch to carry the straggling, pitiful refugees across roaring, bridgeless rivers. Planters waded waist deep through quagmires to succour the injured; doctors from the tea plantations fought epidemics. "They carried out heroic rescues of refugees marooned in the foodless, trackless jungle wilderness." says one report I was allowed read in Lombard-street. "Many suffered severely in health. Some died. But their lives were not given in vain. Some 220,000 refugees were brought to safely."

Andrew Lindsay was given an O.B.E. for his part of helping save the lives of many of those refugees that came to the Indian Tea Association plantations.

== Family ==
His parents were Rev. George Lindsay (1846-1933) from Cortachy in Angus; and Jessie Fawns Mollison (1858-1950) from New Zealand. Rev. Lindsay had emigrated to New Zealand; and they married on 5 Jun 1878 there.

George and Jessie had a daughter and five sons, including Andrew.

Andrew Lindsay married Ethel Eliz Goddard (1881-1964) on 1 March 1918 in Mumbai, India at the Afghan Memorial Church in Colaba. Ethel was the younger daughter of W. H. Goddard of Folkestone, England.
