= John Bell (rugby union, born 1879) =

Scotland international rugby union player (1879-1962)

- Born: John Alexander Bell; 13 December 1879 Airdrie, Scotland
- Died: 16 March 1962 (aged 82) London, Scotland

Rugby union career
- Position: Forward
Amateur team(s)
Years	Team	Apps	(Points)
- Clydesdale
1902-03	London Scottish		
Provincial / State sides
Years	Team	Apps	(Points)
1900-01	Glasgow District		
1901	Cities District		
1902	Anglo-Scots		
International career
Years	Team	Apps	(Points)
1901-02	Scotland	6	(0)

John Bell (13 December 1879 – 16 March 1962) was a Scottish international rugby union player.

== Rugby Union career ==
=== Amateur career ===
Bell played for Clydesdale. He was made captain of the club in September 1900.

He moved to play for London Scottish in 1902.

=== Provincial career ===
He played for Glasgow District against Edinburgh District in the 1900 Inter-City match and in the 1901 Inter-City match.

He played for Cities District against Provinces District on 12 January 1901.

On moving to play for London Scottish, he then played for Anglo-Scots on 27 December 1902.

=== International career ===
He played 6 matches for Scotland from 1901 to 1902.
