= Hugh Wright (rugby union) =

Scotland international rugby union player

- Born: Hugh Brooks Wright; 7 November 1875 Inveraray, Scotland
- Died: 24 December 1953 (aged 78) Leeds, England

Rugby union career
- Position: Forward
Amateur team(s)
Years	Team	Apps	(Points)
- Watsonians
Provincial / State sides
Years	Team	Apps	(Points)
- Edinburgh District
-	Cities District		
-	East of Scotland District		
International career
Years	Team	Apps	(Points)
1894	Scotland	1	(0)

Hugh Wright (7 November 1875 – 24 December 1953) was a Scotland international rugby football player.

== Rugby Union career ==
=== Amateur career ===
He played for Watsonians.

=== Provincial career ===
Wright played for Edinburgh District in the 1893 inter-city match.

He played for Cities District in 1893.

He played for East of Scotland District in 1894.

=== International career ===
He was capped once for Scotland in 1894.

=== Coaching career ===
He coached Harrogate Old Boys; and was for a time, a coach at Ampleforth College.

== Boxing career ==
He was a Scottish amateur boxing champion.

== Rowing career ==
He was a keen rower, and was in the Portbello Amateur Rowing Club.

== Family ==
He was born to Quintin Montgomery Wright (1826-1886), a solicitor, and Prudence Elizabeth Blake Giraud (1825-1919). Hugh was one of their nine children.

Hugh married Dora Jane Hutton (1885-1939) in Wetherby, Yorkshire in 1907.

== Death ==
He died at Leeds General Infirmary. He is buried in St. Mary's churchyard in Boston Spa, Yorkshire.
