= 1901–02 Scottish Districts season =

Rugby union competition

- Countries: Scotland
- Date: 1901–02
- Matches played: 1

The 1901–02 Scottish Districts season is a record of all the rugby union matches for Scotland's district teams.

== History ==
Edinburgh District beat Glasgow District in the Inter-City match.

North v South-West

This season Greenock Wanderers were told that they could not be nominated for any Glasgow District sides. In the future their players could only be selected for the South-Western District.

== Results ==
Date	Try	Conversion	Penalty	Dropped goal	Goal from mark	Notes
1894–1904	3 points	2 points	3 points	4 points	4 points	

=== Inter-City ===
7 December 1901

Glasgow District	0 - 2 goals, 2 tries	Edinburgh District
	Report

Hamilton Crescent, Glasgow

Glasgow District:
Edinburgh District:

=== Other Scottish matches ===
25 December 1901

South of Scotland District	0 - 1 goal	Anglo-Scots
	Report

Inverleith, Edinburgh

South of Scotland:
Anglo-Scots:

11 January 1902

Provinces District	v	Cities District
	Preview

Melrose

Provinces:
Cities:

=== English matches ===
No other District matches played.

=== International matches ===
No touring matches this season.
