= Alexander Anderson (rugby union) =

Scotland international rugby union player

- Born: Alexander Harvie Anderson; 4 November 1873 Hamilton, South Lanarkshire, Scotland
- Died: 14 December 1939 (aged 66) Glasgow, Scotland

Rugby union career
- Position: Forward
Amateur team(s)
Years	Team	Apps	(Points)
- Glasgow Academicals
–	Merchistonians		
–	Greenock Wanderers		
Provincial / State sides
Years	Team	Apps	(Points)
-	Glasgow District		
-	Cities District		
-	West of Scotland District		
International career
Years	Team	Apps	(Points)
1894	Scotland	1	(0)

Alexander Anderson (4 November 1873 – 14 December 1939) was a Scotland international rugby football player.

== Rugby Union career ==
=== Amateur career ===
He played for Glasgow Academicals.

He also played for Merchistonians.

He played for Greenock Wanderers for one match in December 1894.

=== Provincial career ===
Anderson played for Glasgow District in the 1893 and 1894 inter-city matches.

He played for Cities District in 1893.

He played for West of Scotland District in 1894.

=== International career ===
He was capped once for Scotland in 1894.

== Military career ==
He joined the Royal Engineers in 1894 as a submarine miner, in the Clyde division as a 2nd Lieutenant.

He rose to be a Lieutenant Colonel, serving in the First World War.

== Business career ==
He was a managing director of D. and J. Anderson Ltd., Atlantic Mills in Bridgeton, Glasgow. The textile firm was founded by his grandfather.

== Other sports ==
He stayed in Cove near Helensburgh; and became a keen yachtsman. He was a member of the Royal Clyde Club since 1898.

He listed a notice to change a ship's name in Lloyd's List of 16 February 1910:

OFFICIAL NOTICE. - PROPOSAL TO CHARGE A SHIPS NAME. I, ALEXANDER HARVIE ANDERSON. of Knockderry.. Cove, Dunbartonshire, hereby give NOTICE that, in come• quence of change of ownership, it is my intention to APPLY to the BOARD OF TRADE, under Section 47 of the Merchant Shipping Act, 1894, in respect of my ship "Mo Run," of Inverness, official number 118,163, of gross tonnage 50'04 tons, of register tonnage 49'15 tons, heretofore owned by Lionel Maynard Torin, of Junior Carlton Club, Pall Mall, London, for PERMISSION to CHANGE her NAME to " VANORA." to beregistered in the said new name at the port of Greenock, as owned by me. Any objections to the proposed change of name must be sent' to the Assistant Secretary, Marine Department, Board of Trade. within seven days from the appearance of this advertisement. Dated at Greenock, this 15th day of February, 1910. ALEXANDER HARVIE ANDERSON.

== Family ==
He was born to John Anderson (1827–1911) and Jessie McLaren Harvie (1842–1910).

They had 7 daughters and 2 sons, including Alexander.

== Death ==
He died in a nursing home in Glasgow.
