= Doug Keller =

Australia & Scotland international rugby union player

- Born: Douglas Holcombe Keller; 18 June 1922 Wee Waa, Australia
- Died: 20 March 2004 (aged 81) Sydney, Australia
- School: Sydney Grammar School
- University: University of Sydney

Rugby union career
- Position: Flanker
Amateur team(s)
Years	Team	Apps	(Points)
1942-45	Sydney University		
1946-47	Drummoyne		
- Guy's Hospital
- London Scottish
- Sheffield
1952	Drummoyne		
1957	Eastwood		
Provincial / State sides
Years	Team	Apps	(Points)
1947	New South Wales Waratahs		
1948	Anglo-Scots		
1948	Blues Trial		
1949	Scotland Probables		
1950	Yorkshire		
International career
Years	Team	Apps	(Points)
1947-48	Australia	6	(0)
1949-50	Scotland	7	(0)

Doug Keller (18 June 1922 – 20 March 2004) was a Scotland international rugby union player and an Australia international rugby union player. He played at flanker.

Keller was a noted urologist, and with a Scottish grandmother, on moving to London to study further in the field, he played rugby union for London Scottish to signal his availability to the Scottish national team.

== Rugby Union career ==
=== Amateur career ===
He played rugby union for Sydney University.

He then moved to play for Drummoyne.

On moving to England, Keller first played for Guy's Hospital and then made use of his Scottish roots and played for London Scottish.

He played for Sheffield in 1950.

In 1952, he moved back to Australia. He returned to play for Drummoyne but retired mid season.

In 1957 he played for Eastwood. He was subsequently the Club's 1st Grade coach President and then Patron.

=== Provincial career ===
Keller was picked to play for the New South Wales Waratahs.

On becoming known on Scotland's radar in London, he was selected for the Anglo-Scots to play against the Provinces District on 11 December 1948.

Impressing in that match, Keller was then selected for the Blues Trial side in their match against the Whites Trial side on 18 December 1948.

He was then placed in the Scotland Probables side for the final trial against Scotland Possibles on 8 January 1949. The Possibles won the match, but should have been more comfortably ahead at half time. In the second half, a stack of positional changes made the match a lot closer, one of which was to put Keller on as a flanker, together with Douglas Elliot.

While at Sheffield, Keller played for Yorkshire, and captained the side.

=== International career ===
He was capped first for Australia in 1947, first as a prop but was then moved to flanker, and played 6 times in total for the Wallabies.

In the 1947-48 season, Keller played in 3 matches for Australia against Scottish districts:- North of Scotland, South of Scotland and Cities District, before playing against Scotland in November 1947.

On moving to London and playing for London Scottish, he was then capped for Scotland in 1949, and played 7 times for the Scots.

Keller's nationality switch was not the only high-profile switch of the time. Ian Botting had made the move from the All Blacks to England. In 1950, the IRB voted to ban any overseas player from representing a Scottish, English, or Welsh national side, that had previously been capped by a British Commonwealth country; and this stymied Keller's future Scotland selection, as well as Botting's future England selection. The new rule did not preclude such a player switching nationalities once more to play for their first selected country, and Keller later returned to Australia.

== Medical career ==
He was a doctor and moved to London to study as a specialist urologist.
