= 1896–97 Scottish Districts season =

Rugby union competition

- Countries: Scotland
- Date: 1896–97
- Matches played: 1

The 1896–97 Scottish Districts season is a record of all the rugby union matches for Scotland's district teams.

== History ==
Glasgow District beat Edinburgh District in the Inter-City match.

== Results ==
| Date | Try | Conversion | Penalty | Dropped goal | Goal from mark | Notes |
|---|---|---|---|---|---|---|
| 1894–1904 | 3 points | 2 points | 3 points | 4 points | 4 points | |

=== Inter-City ===
5 December 1896

| Glasgow District | 3 - 0 | Edinburgh District |
| | Report |

Hamilton Crescent, Glasgow

Glasgow District:
Edinburgh District:

=== Other Scottish matches ===
28 November 1896

| Edinburgh District | 3 - 13 | South of Scotland District |
| | Preview; Report; Report |

Powderhall, Edinburgh

Edinburgh District:
South of Scotland District:

21 December 1896

| North of Scotland District | 0 - 3 | Midlands District |
| | Report | Try: Smart |

North of Scotland:
Midlands:

26 December 1896

| Cities District | v | Provinces District |
| | Preview; Preview; Report |

Hawick

Cities District:
Provinces District:

=== English matches ===
No other District matches played.

=== International matches ===
No touring matches this season.
