= Ronald Stevenson (rugby union) =

Scotland international rugby union player

- Born: Ronald Cochran Stevenson; 25 July 1873 South Shields, England
- Died: 12 February 1934 (aged 60) Tynemouth, England

Rugby union career
- Position: Forward
Amateur team(s)
Years	Team	Apps	(Points)
- Northumberland
–	London Scottish		
Provincial / State sides
Years	Team	Apps	(Points)
1898	Anglo-Scots		
International career
Years	Team	Apps	(Points)
1897-99	Scotland	6	(0)

Ronald Stevenson (25 July 1873 – 12 February 1934) was a Scotland international rugby union player.

== Rugby Union career ==
=== Amateur career ===
He started by playing for Northumberland.

Stevenson played rugby union for London Scottish.

=== Provincial career ===
He played for the Anglo-Scots on 24 December 1898 in their match against South of Scotland District. He scored a try in the match, which the Anglo-Scots won by 5 points to 4 points.

He was unable to travel to the Cities District versus Provinces District match on 14 January 1899 but his form meant selection for the international side was still considered.

=== International career ===
Stevenson was capped 6 times by Scotland from 1897 to 1899.
