= William Ritchie (rugby union) =

Scottish international rugby union player (1882–1940)

- Born: William Traill Ritchie; 11 March 1882 Dunedin, New Zealand
- Died: 22 May 1940 (aged 58) Timaru, New Zealand
- University: St John's College, Cambridge

Rugby union career
- Position: Wing
Amateur team(s)
Years	Team	Apps	(Points)
- Cambridge University
Provincial / State sides
Years	Team	Apps	(Points)
1903	Anglo-Scots		
1905	Provinces District		
International career
Years	Team	Apps	(Points)
1905	Scotland	2	(0)

William Ritchie (11 March 1882 – 22 May 1940) was a Scotland international rugby union player.

== Rugby Union career ==
=== Amateur career ===
He went to St John's College, Cambridge.

Ritchie played for Cambridge University.

=== Provincial career ===
He played for Anglo-Scots against South of Scotland District on 26 December 1903, having played the day before for Cambridge University in their match against West of Scotland at Partick.

He played for the Provinces District side against the Cities District side in January 1905, while still with Cambridge University.

=== International career ===
He was capped by Scotland twice, in 1905.

== Military career ==
He served in the New Zealand Expeditionary Force, in the 40th Reinforcements, New Zealand Field Artillery in the First World War. He was awarded the Meritorious Service Medal (MSM).

== Family ==
Both his father and grandfather were ministers in the Church of Scotland.

His father John Macfarlane Ritchie (1842-1912) was from Orkney. His mother was Ella McLaren (1853-1932) from Glasgow. Both had emigrated to the Scottish expatriate city of Dunedin in New Zealand; and they married there in 1875. They had a number of sons, including William, and one daughter.

William married Dorothy Cecil Dibbs (1883-1942) from Sydney, Australia in 1909. They had 3 children. One son, Dennis Gordon Ritchie, was in the Royal New Zealand Air Force and died in a forced landing at Ardmore Airport in New Zealand in 1944. His body was pulled from the wreckage but he died in the hospital.

== Death ==
William Ritchie died in Bidwill Private Hospital in Timaru. He is buried in Timaru Cemetery.
