= Charles Fleming (rugby union) =

Scotland international rugby union player

- Born: Charles James Nicol Fleming; 5 April 1868 Edinburgh, Scotland
- Died: 13 November 1948 (aged 80) Auchencairn, Castle Douglas, Scotland
- School: Fettes College
- University: The Queen's College, Oxford

Rugby union career
- Position: Centre
Youth career
- -: Fettes College
Amateur team(s)
Years	Team	Apps	(Points)
-	Oxford University		
–	London Scottish		
–	Edinburgh Wanderers		
Provincial / State sides
Years	Team	Apps	(Points)
1895	Provinces District		
International career
Years	Team	Apps	(Points)
1896-97	Scotland	3	(3)
Refereeing career
Years	Competition		Apps
1903	Scottish Districts		
1910	Border League		

37th President of the Scottish Rugby Union
- In office 1910–1911
- Preceded by: Alexander Blair
- Succeeded by: William Andrew Walls

Charles Fleming (5 April 1868 - 13 November 1948) was a Scotland international rugby union player. He was the 37th President of the Scottish Rugby Union. His regular playing position was Centre.

== Rugby Union career ==
=== Amateur career ===
Fleming went to Fettes College and captained the rugby union side.

Fleming then played for Oxford University, while at The Queen's College, Oxford.

Fleming played for London Scottish.

Fleming played for Edinburgh Wanderers.

=== Provincial career ===
Fleming was due to play for Anglo-Scots in 1892 against Cities District but the match was called off.

Fleming turned out for the Provinces District against Cities District on 28 December 1895. It was remarked that the snow affected his game.

=== International career ===
Fleming played three times for Scotland between 1896 - 97.

=== Referee career ===
Fleming became a referee. He refereed a North of Scotland District versus Midlands District match in 1903.

Fleming refereed in the Border League in 1910.

=== Administrative career ===
Fleming became the 37th President of the Scottish Rugby Union. He served one year from 1910 to 1911.

== Cricket career ==
Fleming played cricket at Fettes College. He played cricket at Oxford University for Mr. A. J. H. Cochrane's side.
