= James Bishop (rugby union) =

Scotland international rugby union player

- Born: James Murray Bishop; 27 December 1867 Partick, Glasgow, Scotland
- Died: 15 January 1938 (aged 70) Glasgow, Scotland

Rugby union career
- Position: Forward
Amateur team(s)
Years	Team	Apps	(Points)
-	Glasgow Academicals		
Provincial / State sides
Years	Team	Apps	(Points)
1892	Glasgow District		
1892	Cities District		
1893	West of Scotland District		
International career
Years	Team	Apps	(Points)
1893	Scotland	1	(0)

James Bishop (27 December 1867 – 15 January 1938) was a Scotland international rugby union player.

== Rugby Union career ==
=== Amateur career ===
Bishop played rugby union for Glasgow Academicals.

=== Provincial career ===
He played for Glasgow District against Edinburgh District in the inter-city match of 17 December 1892.

Bishop was then capped for Cities District in their match against Anglo-Scots on 24 December 1892. In Edinburgh circles his selection for this combined Glasgow-Edinburgh side caused quite a stir as they favoured their own players. The Scottish Referee newspaper had this advice:

If J.M. Bishop is at all annoyed at the intelligence that his selection for Glasgow-Edinburgh was questioned, it may comfort him to know that in Glasgow where he is known better the unanimous verdict was that he had not a superior in the Inter-City and that higher honours are deserved by him.

He was also capped by West of Scotland District in their match against East of Scotland District on 21 January 1893.

=== International career ===
Bishop was capped once by Scotland, in 1893.
