= William Cownie =

- Full name: William Brodie Cownie
- Born: 9 March 1871 Edinburgh, Scotland
- Died: 4 December 1932 (aged 61) Kensington, England

Rugby union career
- Position: Forward
Amateur team(s)
Years	Team	Apps	(Points)
-	Watsonians		
Provincial / State sides
Years	Team	Apps	(Points)
1892	Edinburgh District		
1892	Cities District		
1894	East of Scotland District		
International career
Years	Team	Apps	(Points)
1893–95	Scotland	9	(0)

William Brodie Cownie (9 March 1871 – 4 December 1932) was a Scottish international rugby union player.

== Rugby union career ==
=== Amateur career ===
A Watsonians forward, Cownie was a member the club's undefeated 1892-93 side and later captained them to two Scottish Championship titles.

=== Provincial career ===
He played for Edinburgh District in the 1892 inter-city match against Glasgow District.

He played for Cities District in their 1892 end of year match against Anglo-Scots.

He played for East of Scotland District in their start of year 1894 match against West of Scotland District.

=== International career ===
He was capped nine times for Scotland, appearing in every of their matches from 1893 to 1895, which included three Calcutta Cup triumphs over England.

== Business career ==
After his career, Cownie became a chartered accountant.

Cownie became a prominent businessman who held numerous executive positions throughout his career, many with public utility companies.

== Death ==
He died of typhoid fever at his Kensington home in 1932.

The obituary from Musselburgh News - Friday 09 December 1932 reads:

THE LATE MR W. B. COWNIE. LOSS TO LOTHIANS COMPANY. In the days of transport facilities and electrical development- the passing of William Brodie Cowrie on Sunday last at his flat in Oakwood Mansion, London. acquires an added significance. A Scotsman and old Watsonian, he came of a well known Edinburgh family and from his early days was an outstanding figure. He belonged to Portobello and used to reside in Brunstane Road. Always a first class footballer, he represented Scotland nine times during the years 1893-4-5. After qualifying as a Chartered Accountant he migrated to London, but always retained a soft spot for his native city and its surroundings, often recalling the days of his youth when he played on the beach at Portobello or the vacations spent at the Anchorage, Port Seton. Early in his career he anticipated the developments in the transport and electrical world and was instrumental in the development of a number of companies:- including The Musselburgh and District Electric Light and Traction Company Ltd.; The Lothians Electric Power Company; The Devon General Minibus and Touring Company Ltd.; Torquay Tramways Company. Ltd.; The City of Oxford Motor Services; Electric Finance and Securities Company Ltd.; Mexborough and Swinton Traction Company; The Wisbech Electric Light and Power Company Ltd.; The Rhonda Tramway Company Ltd.; National Electric Construction Company Ltd.; Colne Valley Electric Supply Company; The Northwood Electric Light and Power Company; Foots Cray Electricity Supply Company Ltd.; The Roston and District Electrical Supply Ltd.; The Western Welsh Omnibus Company Ltd; Livermead House Hotel Ltd. and other subsidiaries. The Musselburgh Company was one of the first of which he became managing director. With the development of the motor 'bus business end electrical industry his interests greatly increased until when. within the last few years the National Electric Construction Company became associated with the British Electrical Federation, they extended to all parts of the country. Re was also managing director of all those companies already mentioned. and although controlling so. many undertakings was always ready to listen to the humblest employee. Associated in business with the leaders of industry as Lord St. Davids and G. H. Nisbet. and others. His advice in financial matters was always sought. He is survived by his widow, one daughter and one son. Two sons having predeceased him: one being killed in an aeroplane accident during the war and the youngest in a motor car accident last year in Devonshire. His genial presence will ne greatly missed by the numerous staffs he controlled. Like many other successful Edinburgh men he worked and he won. His constancy, tenacity and dauntless resolution have been an inspiration to many of those under him and his memory will always be held dear by those associated with him. The funeral took place in London on Wednesday when as a mark of respect the offices of the Lothians Electric Power Company at Edinburgh and Musselburgh were closed from 11.30 a.m. until 2 p.m.

== See also ==
- List of Scotland national rugby union players
