= Cecil Abercrombie =

Scottish naval officer, cricketer and rugby union footballer

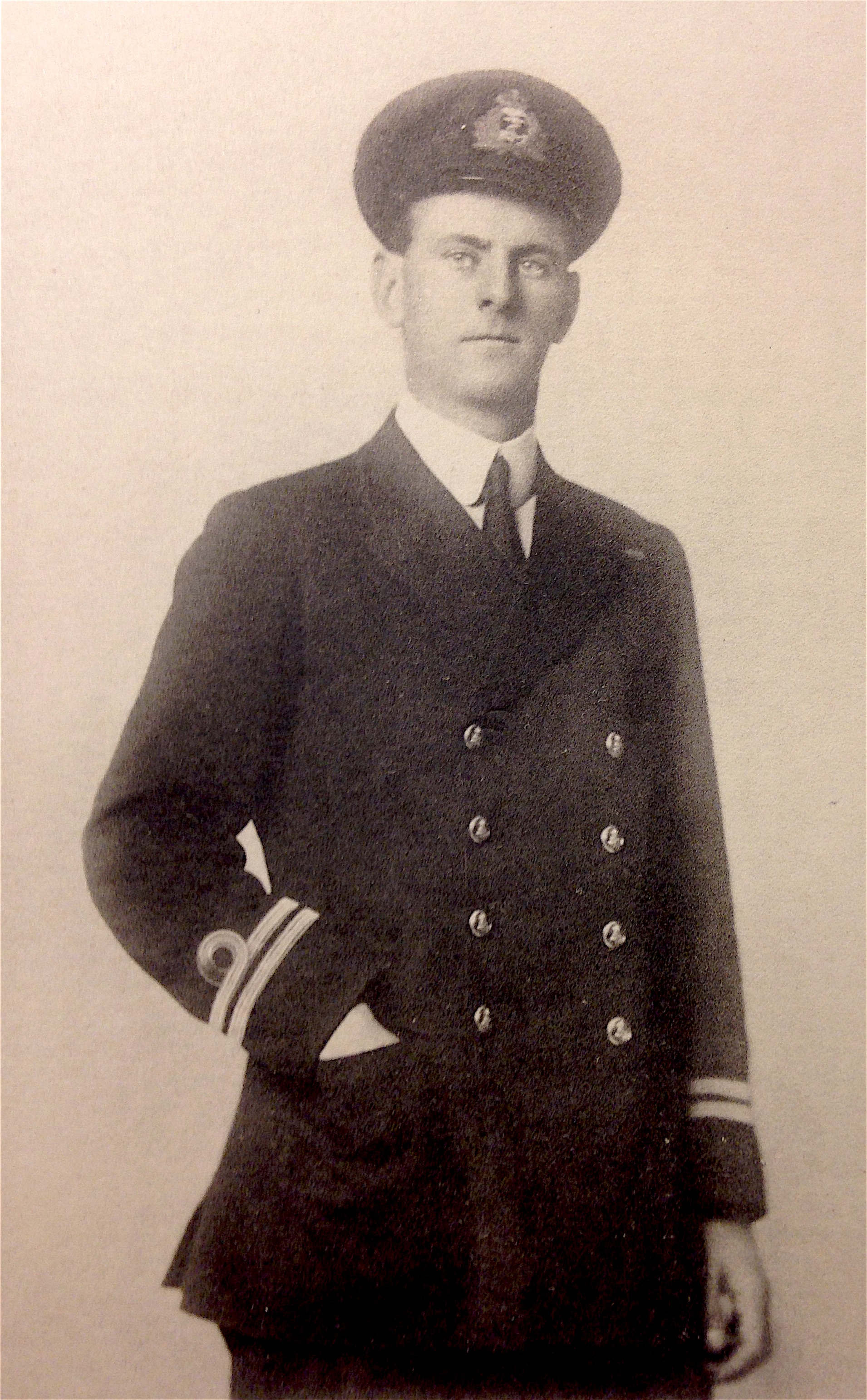
- Abercrombie in 1915
- Born: Cecil Halliday Abercrombie; 12 April 1886 Mozufferpore, Bengal Presidency, British India
- Died: 31 May 1916 (aged 30) North Sea, near Jutland

Rugby union career
- Position: Forward
Amateur team(s)
Years	Team	Apps	(Points)
- United Services
Provincial / State sides
Years	Team	Apps	(Points)
- Provinces District
International career
Years	Team	Apps	(Points)
1910–1913	Scotland	6	(3)
- Cricket career

Cricket information
- Batting: Right-handed
- Bowling: Right-arm medium

Domestic team information
- Years: Team
- 1913: Hampshire

Career statistics
Competition	First-class
Matches	16
Runs scored	1,126
Batting average	40.21
100s/50s	4/2
Top score	165
Balls bowled	551
Wickets	8
Bowling average	41.12
5 wickets in innings	–
10 wickets in match	–
Best bowling	3/27
Catches/stumpings	11/–
- Source: Cricinfo, 1 January 2010

Cecil Halliday Abercrombie (12 April 1886 – 31 May 1916) was a Scottish international rugby union player, first-class cricketer, and an officer in the Royal Navy. Abercrombie passed out from the Britannia Royal Naval College into the Royal Navy in 1902, and shortly thereafter he served aboard HMS Hyacinth in the Dervish War, being part of the force that captured Dervish State's stronghold in 1904. He would later serve aboard HMS Defence at the Battle of Jutland on 31 May 1916, during which he was killed in action.

As a sportsman, he played rugby union at Test level for Scotland from 1910 to 1913, earning six caps. In cricket, he played at first-class level for the Royal Navy and Hampshire, scoring over 1,000 runs and making four centuries.

== Early life and military career ==
The son of the Scotsman Walter Abercrombie, an officer in the Indian Imperial Police, and his wife Kate, he was born in British India at Mozufferpore in April 1886. He was educated in England at Allan House in Guildford, before proceeding to Berkhamsted School. From there, he attended the Britannia Royal Naval College, where he was a renowned sportsman, winning in the high jump, long jump, racquets, fives, and swimming. He passed out into the Royal Navy in 1902 and was posted as a naval cadet to the cruiser HMS Highflyer, serving on the East Indies Station. The following year, he was posted aboard HMS Hyacinth. In April 1904, under the command of Captain Horace Hood, he was in the landing party which captured "Mullah" Hassan's stronghold at Illig on the east coast of Somaliland, as part of the protracted Somaliland Campaign of 1900 to 1920. Abercrombie's service earned him the Africa General Service Medal with clasp. Having been an acting sub-lieutenant, Abercrombie was confirmed in the full rank in May 1906, with promotion to lieutenant in January 1909.

== Sporting notability ==
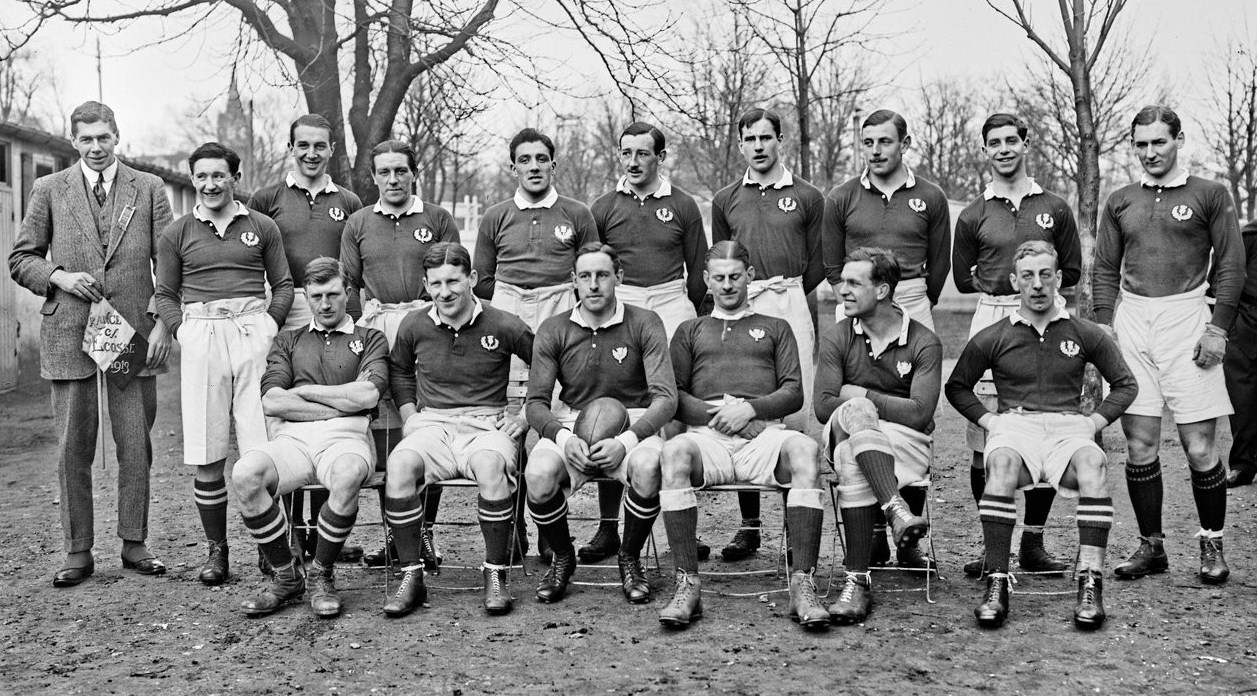
Scotland XV v France, 1 January 1913, Parc des Princes

Having excelled at rugby union at Berkshampsted School, Abercrombie played for the United Services when based at HMNB Portsmouth. He was capped by a 'Rest of Scotland' Provinces Districts side to play against the Cities Districts side in 1907. He scored a try in the match to give Provinces a 21–9 win over the Cities. Abercrombie was selected to play for Scotland in 1910, making his Test debut against Ireland at the Balmoral Showgrounds in the 1910 Five Nations Championship. He played Test rugby for Scotland until 1913, making six appearances and scoring a single try; this try came against France in the 1911 Five Nations Championship. In the closing stages of the match, Scotland trailed by a single point. Abercrombie crossed the French try line for a second time, but seeking to get nearer the posts (thus making the resultant conversion kick easier) he ran back again over the line and was tackled without having grounded the ball, giving the French a one-point margin of victory. Playing as a forward, he was said to have "abundant energy... a splendid physique, great speed and height, and a good pair of hands", and was noted to be a hard and low tackler, in addition to being an adept place-kicker.

Abercrombie was also a talented cricketer, representing the United Services Cricket Club. He learnt most of his cricket playing in the nets at Portsmouth alongside his friend, Lionel Tennyson. His debut in first-class cricket came for a combined Army and Navy cricket team against a combined Oxford and Cambridge Universities cricket team at Aldershot in 1910. He followed this match up with two first-class appearances for the Royal Navy against the British Army cricket team in 1911 and 1912; in the 1911 fixture, he scored exactly 100 in the Royal Navy's second innings. He made his debut for Hampshire against Oxford University at Southampton in 1913, making scores of 126 and 39. He was a regular member of the Hampshire side during the 1913 season, making twelve appearances in the County Championship, and making a further two centuries against Essex and Worcestershire. Against Essex, he made 165 in Hampshire's second innings and shared in a partnership of 305 for the seventh wicket with George Brown, which helped to save the match for Hampshire. In sixteen first-class matches, Abercrombie scored 1,126 runs at an average of 40.21; 936 of these came for Hampshire in 1913. Wisden described his batting style as "delightfully free".

== First World War service and legacy ==
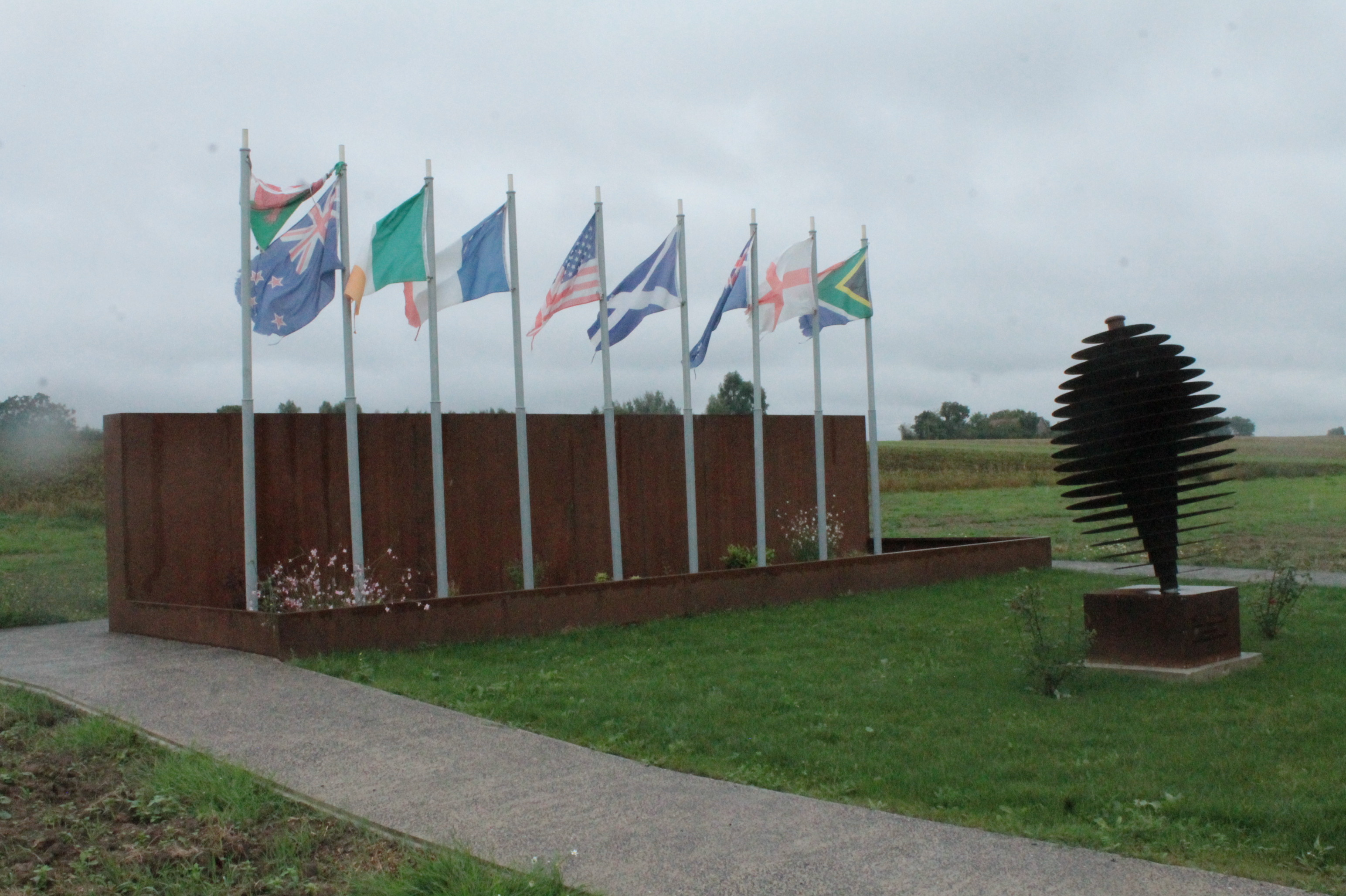
Memorial to the 133 rugby players killed in the Great War, at Fromelles

Abercrombie was away on active duty in 1914, so did not play for Hampshire that season. At the outbreak of the First World War he was with the Mediterranean Station. He returned home in early 1916 and was posted aboard HMS Defence, the flagship of Rear Admiral Sir Robert Arbuthnot. He was with Defence during the Battle of Jutland on 31 May 1916. Abercrombie was present on the ship's bridge during the battle as she drew fire from several German vessels around 3 miles (4.8 km) away from the main British fleet. During this action, the ship was hit by two salvoes which caused her magazines to explode, destroying the ship with the loss of all hands on board. Abercrombie is remembered on the Plymouth Naval Memorial and on the memorial to the 133 rugby players lost in the Great War at Fromelles (Pheasant Wood) Military Cemetery in France.

He left behind a widow, Cecily Joan Abercrombie, née Baker. They married on 29 April 1913. Remarking on his potential as a cricketer had he survived the war, the biographer Christopher Sandford suggested that he may have played post-war Test cricket for England alongside Tennyson.

== See also ==
- List of cricket and rugby union players
- List of international rugby union players killed in action during the First World War
