= Andrew Lindsay (disambiguation) =

Andrew Lindsay is a British rower, later business entrepreneur, CEO of Telecom Plus.

Andrew Lindsay may also refer to:

- Andrew Lindsay (archer) (born 1976), New Zealand archer
- Andrew Lindsay (swimmer) (born 1979), British Paralympic swimmer
- Andrew Lindsay (rugby union) (1885–1970), Scotland international rugby union player
- Andrew Lindsay (musician), musician, member of Fenech-Soler
- Andrew Lindsay, musician with the Canadian band The Saddletramps (1980s until 1995)
- Andrew Lindsay, musician, guitar player with Scottish indie pop band Reverieme
- Lord Andrew Lindsay, a Cambridge student runner, a character in the 1981 British film Chariots of Fire played by Nigel Havers

== See also ==
- Andrew Lindsay Lewis, known as Drew Lewis, American businessman and former Secretary of Transportation
