= Hector Forsayth =

Scotland international rugby union player

- Born: Hector Henry Forsayth; 18 December 1899 Rabaul, Papua New Guinea
- Died: 7 March 1952 (aged 52) Gladstone, Australia
- Notable relative(s): Emma Forsayth, grandmother

Rugby union career
- Position: Full Back
Amateur team(s)
Years	Team	Apps	(Points)
1920-22	Oxford University		
1922	Blackheath		
Provincial / State sides
Years	Team	Apps	(Points)
1920	Anglo-Scots		
1921-22	Scotland Probables		
International career
Years	Team	Apps	(Points)
1921-22	Scotland	7	(0)

Hector Forsayth (18 December 1899 – 7 March 1952) was a Scotland international rugby union player.

== Rugby Union career ==
=== Amateur career ===
Forsayth played for Oxford University. He received two 'blues' for playing against Cambridge in 1920 and 1921.

In 1922 he turned out for Blackheath. The Tatler of 25 October 1922 reporting:

H. H. FORSAYTH, the brilliant Oxford and Scotland full back, created quite a small sensation the other day by turning out for Blackheath. It had been generally assumed, and indeed announced in the Press, that, having finished his Oxford career, he would return to Australia but he appeared at the Rectory Field against Newport, and is said to be available for the rest of the season. His arrival is most opportune, for Blackheath badly needed a first-class full back, no one having been found worthy of filling the shoes of the redoubtable B. S. Cumberlege.

Forsayth played a splendid game against Newport, and had much to do with keeping the score down to reasonable proportions. In the second half he was seized with cramp, and after one or two plucky efforts to continue, had to leave the field shortly before the close. This may have been due to being only partly fit, as is natural enough in one's first game of the season, or it may have been the result of fastening his stockings too tightly. It was to be observed during the first aid so zealously administered by R. Edwards, the burly English International playing for Newport, that Forsayth had tied up his stockings with what appeared to be a stay-lace if there are such things nowadays -and if this were too tight it might easily cause cramp. The best thing to keep up one's stockings is the old-fashioned, home-made garter of elastic about an inch broad. But I may be trespassing on Eve's province, so enough said!

The fact that Forsayth returned to Rugby in the red and black of Blackheath, and not in the chaste attire of the London Scottish, furnished food for mirth to the ungodly, who chose to see in this an indication of the slenderness of the player's connection with Scotland, for whom he has played so many great games during the past two seasons. He came to Oxford from Australia, I believe, as a Rhodes scholar, and doubtless had some sort of kinship with Scotland, who were glad enough to secure his services at a time when they were suffering from a dearth of fullbacks. It is most unusual, however, for a Scottish Rugby man to play for any club except the London Scottish, hence the restrained amusement of some of the onlookers at the Rectory Field.

The Illustrated Sporting and Dramatic News of 21 October 1922 reported on Blackheath's match against Newport:

Forsayth's defence, and especially his kicking powers, are well known, and he was at his best on Saturday. His presence certainly kept down the Newport score, and the visiting forwards by no means appreciated the gruelling he gave thorn. There is no better full back in Rugby to-day than Forsayth, and he will immensely strengthen the Blackheath defence.

=== Provincial career ===
Forsayth played for Anglo-Scots against Provinces District on 25 December 1920.

He turned out for Scotland Probables in their match against Scotland Possibles on 8 January 1921; and for Provinces District on 10 December 1921; and again for Scotland Probables in their match against Scotland Possibles on 24 December 1921; and their match against Possibles on 23 December 1922.

=== International career ===
He played for Scotland 7 times, from 1921 to 1922.

The Pall Mall Gazette of 13 January 1923 noted that Forsayth was dropped in favour of Drysdale, for the 1923 Five Nations Championship, and assumed that Forsayth going to Blackheath instead of London Scottish was the cause of this:

Forsayth dropped. The Scottish side is also published, and the surprise was the leaving out of Forsayth and playing Drysdale. If the latter is better than the Blackheath man he must indeed be a great find, as Forsayth is looked upon as the best back in the United Kingdom. Is it possible that he has been left out owing to his wishing to play for Blackheath instead of the London Scottish?

== Family ==
He was born in Rabaul in Papua New Guinea and baptised in Sydney, Australia. His father was Jonas Mynderse Coe Forsayth (1872-1941) from Samoa, and his mother Ida Schmitz (1878-1947), also from Samoa, from German origin. It is through Hector's father's side comes the Scottish family name and connection, as his grandmother (Jonas's mother) Emma Coe married James Forsayth, a Scottish seaman (Jonas's father and Hector's grandfather).
