= 1908–09 Scottish Districts season =

Rugby union competition

- Countries: Scotland
- Date: 1908–09
- Matches played: 1

The 1908–09 Scottish Districts season is a record of all the rugby union matches for Scotland's district teams.

== History ==
Edinburgh District beat Glasgow District in the Inter-City match

== Results ==
Date	Try	Conversion	Penalty	Dropped goal	Goal from mark	Notes
1905–1947	3 points	2 points	3 points	4 points	3 points	

=== Inter-City ===
5 December 1908

Glasgow District	1 try - 1 goal, 1 try	Edinburgh District
	Report; Report

Hamilton Crescent, Glasgow

Glasgow District:
Edinburgh District:

=== Other Scottish matches ===
7 November 1908

Midlands District	v	North of Scotland District
	Report

Carnegie Park

Midlands District:
North of Scotland District:

14 November 1908

North of Scotland District	v	Western League
	Preview

Aberdeen

North of Scotland District:
Western League:

23 November 1908

Eastern League	v	Western League
	Preview

Edinburgh

Eastern League:
Western League:

26 December 1908

Provinces	6 - 3	Anglo-Scots
	Report

Inverleith
Referee: Andrew Flett

Provinces:
Anglo-Scots:

16 January 1909

Cities District	v	Provinces District
	Report

Inverleith
Referee: Andrew Flett

Cities:
Provinces:

=== English matches ===
No other District matches played.

=== International matches ===
No touring matches this season.
