= 1909–10 Scottish Districts season =

Rugby union competition

- Countries: Scotland
- Date: 1909–10
- Matches played: 1

The 1909–10 Scottish Districts season is a record of all the rugby union matches for Scotland's district teams.

== History ==
Edinburgh District beat Glasgow District in the Inter-City match

== Results ==
Date	Try	Conversion	Penalty	Dropped goal	Goal from mark	Notes
1905–1947	3 points	2 points	3 points	4 points	3 points	

=== Inter-City ===
18 December 1909

Glasgow District	1 gl, 2 tries - 2 goal, 2 tries	Edinburgh District
	Report

Hamilton Crescent, Glasgow

Glasgow District:
Edinburgh District:

=== Other Scottish matches ===
25 December 1909

Provinces	22 - 3	Anglo-Scots
	Report

Inverleith

Provinces:
Anglo-Scots:

8 January 1910

Cities District	13 - 5	Provinces
	Report

Inverleith

Cities:
Provinces:

=== English matches ===
South v London Scottish 27 November

=== International matches ===
No touring matches this season.
