= 1948–49 Scottish Districts season =

Rugby union competition

- Countries: Scotland
- Date: 1948–49
- Matches played: 10

The 1948–49 Scottish Districts season is a record of all the rugby union matches for Scotland's district teams.

== History ==
Glasgow District beat Edinburgh District in the Inter-City match.

South play Durham County 21 October 1948.

== Results ==
| Date | Try | Conversion | Penalty | Dropped goal | Goal from mark | Notes |
|---|---|---|---|---|---|---|
| 1948–1970 | 3 points | 2 points | 3 points | 3 points | 3 points | |

=== Inter-City ===
4 December 1948

| Glasgow District | 9 - 3 | Edinburgh District |
| | Report |

Old Anniesland, Glasgow

Glasgow District:
Edinburgh District:

=== Other Scottish matches ===
6 November 1948

| Midlands District | 12 - 11 | North of Scotland District |
| | Report |

Midlands District:
North of Scotland District:

6 November 1948

| Rest of the West | 6 - 14 | Glasgow District |
| | Score |

Rest of the West:
Glasgow District:

13 November 1948

| North of Scotland District | 8 - 3 | South of Scotland District |
| | Preview; Report; Report |

Viewlands, Perth

North of Scotland District:
South of Scotland District:

27 November 1948 postponed to 11 December 1948

| Provinces District | 6 - 8 | Anglo-Scots |
| | Report |

Hawick

Provinces District:
Anglo-Scots:

=== Junior matches ===
6 November 1948

| South of Scotland District | 3 - 6 | Edinburgh District |
| | Score |

South of Scotland District:
Edinburgh District:

20 November 1948

| East of Scotland District | 11 - 14 | West of Scotland District |
| | Preview; Score |

East of Scotland District:
West of Scotland District:

=== Trial matches ===
18 December 1948

| Blues Trial | 9 - 14 | Whites Trial |
| | Report |

Blues Trial:
Whites Trial:

8 January 1949

| Scotland Probables | 6 - 8 | Scotland Possibles |
| | Report |

Probables:
Possibles:

=== English matches ===
21 October 1948

| South of Scotland District | - | Durham County |
| | Preview |

Riverside Park, Jedburgh

South of Scotland District:
Durham County:

=== International matches ===
No touring matches this season.
