= William Thomson (rugby union) =

Scotland international rugby union player

- Born: William Hunter Hope Thomson; 15 August 1880 Haslingden, England
- Died: 25 August 1942 (aged 62) Manly, New South Wales, Australia

Rugby union career
- Position: Forward
Amateur team(s)
Years	Team	Apps	(Points)
- West of Scotland
Provincial / State sides
Years	Team	Apps	(Points)
- Glasgow District
-	Cities District		
International career
Years	Team	Apps	(Points)
1906	Scotland	1	(0)

William Thomson (15 August 1880 – 25 August 1942) was a Scotland international rugby union player. He played at the Forward position.

== Rugby Union career ==
=== Amateur career ===
Thomson played for West of Scotland.

=== Provincial career ===
He was capped by Glasgow District in 1906. He was later capped that same season by the Cities District side.

=== International career ===
Thomson was capped by Scotland for just one match. This was the touring match against South Africa at Hampden Park on 17 November 1906. Scotland won the match 6 - 0.
