= 1982–83 Scottish Inter-District Championship =

Rugby union competition

- Countries: Scotland
- Date: 1982–83
- Champions: South
- Runners-up: Anglo-Scots
- Matches played: 10

The 1982–83 Scottish Inter-District Championship was a rugby union competition for Scotland's district teams.

This season saw the 30th Scottish Inter-District Championship.

South won the competition with 4 wins.

== 1982-83 League Table ==
| Team | P | W | D | L | PF | PA | +/- | Pts |
|---|---|---|---|---|---|---|---|---|
| South | 4 | 4 | 0 | 0 | 94 | 34 | +60 | 8 |
| Anglo-Scots | 4 | 3 | 0 | 1 | 60 | 36 | +24 | 6 |
| Edinburgh District | 4 | 2 | 0 | 2 | 88 | 66 | +22 | 4 |
| Glasgow District | 4 | 1 | 0 | 3 | 57 | 58 | -1 | 2 |
| North and Midlands | 4 | 0 | 0 | 4 | 31 | 136 | -105 | 0 |

== Results ==
| Date | Try | Conversion | Penalty | Dropped goal | Goal from mark | Notes |
|---|---|---|---|---|---|---|
| 1977–1991 | 4 points | 2 points | 3 points | 3 points | —N/a | |

=== Round 1 ===
18 September 1982

| Anglo-Scots | 36 – 10 | North and Midlands |
| | Report |

Athletic Ground, Richmond
Referee: C. J. Shuttie (London Society) replaced by M. Coley (London Society)

Anglo-Scots:
North and Midlands:

=== Round 2 ===
30 October 1982

| Anglo-Scots | 6 – 3 | Glasgow District |
| | Report |

Gosforth, Newcastle
Referee: D. J. Wilson (Yorkshire)

Anglo-Scots:
Glasgow District:

30 October 1982

| North and Midlands | 9 – 34 | Edinburgh District |
| | Report |

Rubislaw, Aberdeen
Referee: G. Inglis (Selkirk)

North and Midlands:
Anglo-Scots:

=== Round 3 ===
4 December 1982

| Edinburgh District | 25 – 12 | Glasgow District |
| | Report |

Myreside
Referee: S. R. Hilditch (Ireland)

Edinburgh District:
Glasgow District:

4 December 1982

| North and Midlands | 6 – 27 | South |
| | Report |

Duffus Park, Cupar
Referee: L. M. Prideaux (England)

North and Midlands:
South of Scotland:

=== Round 4 ===
11 December 1982

| South | 33 – 19 | Edinburgh District |
| | Report |

Netherdale, Galashiels
Referee: A. M. Hosie (Hillhead)

South of Scotland:
Edinburgh District:

=== Round 5 ===
18 December 1982

| Glasgow District | 3 – 21 | South |
| | Report |

Murrayfield Stadium
Referee: J. B. Anderson (Corstorphine)

Glasgow District:
South of Scotland:

18 December 1982

| Edinburgh District | 10 –12 | Anglo-Scots |
| | Report |

Murrayfield Stadium
Referee: J. A. Short (Hawick)

Edinburgh District:
Anglo-Scots:

=== Round 6 ===
29 January 1983

| South | 13 – 6 | Anglo-Scots |
| | Report |

The Greenyards, Melrose
Referee: G. M. Anderson (Allan Glen's)

South of Scotland:
Anglo-Scots:

29 January 1983

| Glasgow District | 39 – 6 | North and Midlands |
| | Report |

Hughenden Stadium
Referee: J. M. Fleming (Boroughmuir)

Glasgow District:
North and Midlands:

== Matches outwith then Championship ==
=== English matches ===
21 September 1982

| Northumberland | – | Glasgow District |
| | Preview |

Percy Park, Northumberland

Northumberland:
Glasgow District:
