= 1981–82 Scottish Inter-District Championship =

Rugby union competition

- Countries: Scotland
- Date: 1981–82
- Champions: Edinburgh District / South
- Runners-up: Anglo-Scots
- Matches played: 10

The 1981–82 Scottish Inter-District Championship was a rugby union competition for Scotland's district teams.

This season saw the 29th Scottish Inter-District Championship. It saw the first entry of the Scottish Exiles - then known as the Anglo-Scots - side into the Championship.

South and Edinburgh District shared the competition with 3 wins and a draw.

== 1981-82 League Table ==
Team	P	W	D	L	PF	PA	+/-	Pts
Edinburgh District	4	3	1	0	80	28	+52	7
South	4	3	1	0	93	52	+41	7
Anglo-Scots	3	1	0	2	46	44	+2	2
Glasgow District	4	1	0	3	36	81	-45	2
North and Midlands	3	0	0	3	29	79	-50	0

The North and Midlands match with the Anglo-Scots was deemed as invalid; as the Exile side fielded ineligible players. The match was not replayed.

== Results ==
Date	Try	Conversion	Penalty	Dropped goal	Goal from mark	Notes
1977–1991	4 points	2 points	3 points	3 points	—	

=== Round 1 ===
27 October 1981

Glasgow District	10 – 20	Anglo-Scots
	Preview; Report

Hughenden Stadium
Referee: S. R. Hildich (Ireland)

Glasgow District:
Anglo-Scots:

31 October 1981

Edinburgh District	30 – 6	North and Midlands
	Preview; Report

Jocks Lodge, Edinburgh
Referee: G. M. Anderson (Allan Glens F.P)

Edinburgh District:
North and Midlands:

=== Round 2 ===
5 December 1981

Glasgow District	3 – 29	Edinburgh District
	Preview; Report; Report

Hughenden Stadium
Referee: G. I. Inglis (Selkirk)

Glasgow District:
Edinburgh District:

5 December 1981

South	29 – 19	North and Midlands
	Preview; Report

Netherdale, Galashiels
Referee: A. M. Hosie (Hillhead)

South:
North and Midlands:

=== Round 3 ===
8 December 1981

North and Midlands	12 – 8	Anglo-Scots
	Preview; Report

Murrayfield Stadium

Match played at Murrayfield was only deemed a bounce game as the Anglo-Scots were without key players and their team was augmented by North and Midlands players.

North and Midlands:
Anglo-Scots:

=== Round 4 ===
12 December 1981

Edinburgh District	12 – 12	South
	Preview; Report

Murrayfield Stadium
Referee: J. B. Campbell (Kilmarnock)

Edinburgh District:
South:

=== Round 5 ===
23 January 1982

Glasgow District	3 – 27	South
	Preview; Report

Hughenden Stadium
Referee: J. M. Fleming (Boroughmuir)

Glasgow District:
South:

23 January 1982 postponed to 27 March 1982

Edinburgh District	9 – 7	Anglo-Scots
	Preview; Report

Raeburn Place, Edinburgh
Referee: P. C. Robertson (Hawick)

Edinburgh District:
Anglo-Scots:

=== Round 6 ===
30 January 1982

Anglo-Scots	18 – 25	South
	Preview; Report

Roehampton
Referee: G. Crawford (London)

Anglo-Scots:
South:

30 January 1982

North and Midlands	4 – 20	Glasgow District
	Preview; Report

University Park, St. Andrews
Referee: T. Allan (Melrose)

North and Midlands:
Glasgow District:

== Matches outwith the Championship ==
=== Other Scottish matches ===
7 October 1981

Glasgow District	–	Rest of the West

Glasgow:
Rest of the West:

=== Junior matches ===
4 November 1981

Midlands District	–	South

Cupar

Midlands:
South:

11 November 1981

South	–	Glasgow District

Kelso

South:
Glasgow District:

25 November 1981

Glasgow District	–	Midlands District

Hughenden

Glasgow District:
Midlands District:

26 January 1982

Midlands District	–	Midlands District U21

Cupar

Midlands District:
Midlands District U21:

3 February 1982

Glasgow District	–	Edinburgh District

Hughenden

Glasgow District:
Edinburgh District:

17 February 1982

Edinburgh District	–	South

Edinburgh

Edinburgh District:
South of Scotland District:

3 March 1982

Edinburgh District	–	Midlands District

Edinburgh

Edinburgh District:
Midlands District:

=== English matches ===
23 September 1981

Glasgow District	6 - 3	(England) Northumberland
	Report

Hughenden
Referee: G. I. Inglis (Selkirk)

Glasgow District:
Northumberland:

29 September 1981

(England) Durham County	-	South of Scotland District

Durham County:
South of Scotland District:

7 October 1981

(England) Warwickshire	-	Anglo-Scots

Coventry

Warwickshire:
Anglo-Scots:

=== Irish matches ===
19 September 1981

South of Scotland District	-	(Ireland) Ulster

South of Scotland District:
Ulster:

=== French matches ===
2 September 1981

Edinburgh District 'B'	-	(France) Perpignan

Inverleith

Edinburgh District 'B':
Perpignan:

4 September 1981

Edinburgh District	-	(France) Perpignan

Goldenacre

Edinburgh District:
Perpignan:

=== Trial matches ===
2 January 1982

Blues Trial	32 - 26	Whites Trial
	Report

Murrayfield Stadium
Referee: A. M. Hosie (Hillhead)

Blues:
Whites:

=== International matches ===
19 September 1981

Edinburgh District	-	Romania

Myreside

Edinburgh District:
Romania:

22 September 1981

South of Scotland District	10 - 18	Romania
	Report

Greenyards, Melrose

South of Scotland District:
Romania:
