= Jock Scott (rugby union) =

Scotland international rugby union player

- Born: John Menzies Baillie Scott; 6 October 1887 Edinburgh, Scotland
- Died: 14 January 1967 (aged 79) Edinburgh, Scotland

Rugby union career
- Position: Flanker
Amateur team(s)
Years	Team	Apps	(Points)
- Edinburgh Academicals
Provincial / State sides
Years	Team	Apps	(Points)
- Edinburgh District
- Cities District
1911	Blues Trial		
International career
Years	Team	Apps	(Points)
1907-13	Scotland	21	(3)

Jock Scott (6 October 1887 – 14 January 1967) was a Scotland international rugby union player who played at the Flanker position.

== Rugby Union career ==
=== Amateur career ===
Scott played for Edinburgh Academicals.

=== Provincial career ===
Scott was capped by Glasgow District in 1906. He was later capped by the Cities District side that same season in early 1907. He played for the Blues Trial side against the Whites Trial side on 21 January 1911 while still with Edinburgh Academicals.

=== International career ===
Scott was capped by Scotland for 21 matches.
