= 1983–84 Scottish Inter-District Championship =

Rugby union competition

- Countries: Scotland
- Date: 1983–84
- Champions: South
- Runners-up: Edinburgh / Anglo-Scots / Glasgow
- Matches played: 10

The 1983–84 Scottish Inter-District Championship was a rugby union competition for Scotland's district teams.

This season saw the 31st Scottish Inter-District Championship.

South won the competition with 4 wins.

== 1983-84 League Table ==
Team	P	W	D	L	PF	PA	+/-	Pts
South	4	4	0	0	114	30	+84	8
Edinburgh District	4	2	0	2	107	59	+48	4
Anglo-Scots	4	2	0	2	46	43	+3	4
Glasgow District	4	2	0	2	57	71	-14	4
North and Midlands	4	0	0	4	28	149	-121	0

== Results ==
Date	Try	Conversion	Penalty	Dropped goal	Goal from mark	Notes
1977–1991	4 points	2 points	3 points	3 points	—	

=== Round 1 ===
25 October 1983

Glasgow District	16 – 20	Anglo-Scots
	Preview; Report

Hughenden Stadium
Referee: R. Parker (North Midlands)

Glasgow District:
Anglo-Scots:

=== Round 2 ===
29 October 1983

North and Midlands	13 – 18	Glasgow District
	Preview; Report

Northern Meeting Park, Inverness
Referee: J. Fleming (Boroughmuir)

North and Midlands:
Glasgow District:

29 October 1983

Anglo-Scots	7 – 12	Edinburgh District
	Preview; Report

Athletic Ground, Richmond
Referee: G. Crawford (London Society)

Anglo-Scots:
Edinburgh District:

=== Round 3 ===
6 December 1983

South	44 – 6	North and Midlands
	Preview; Report

Poynder Park, Kelso
Referee: D. Leslie (Lancashire)

South:
North and Midlands:

=== Round 4 ===
10 December 1983

Glasgow District	14 – 12	Edinburgh District
	Preview; Report

Hughenden Stadium
Referee: T. E. Allan (Melrose)

Glasgow District:
Edinburgh District:

10 December 1983

Anglo-Scots	0 – 15	South
	Preview; Report

Heywood Road, Sale
Referee: D. Leslie (Manchester Society)

Anglo-Scots:
South:

=== Round 5 ===
17 December 1983

Edinburgh District	15 – 29	South
	Preview; Report

Myreside
Referee: A. M. Hosie (Hillhead)

Edinburgh District:
South:

17 December 1983

North and Midlands	0 – 19	Anglo-Scots
	Preview; Report

McKane Park, Dunfermline
Referee: A. P. Thomson (Gloucester Society)

North and Midlands:
Anglo-Scots:

=== Round 6 ===
24 December 1983

Edinburgh District	68 – 9	North and Midlands
	Preview; Report

Murrayfield Stadium

Edinburgh District:
North and Midlands:

24 December 1983

South	26 – 9	Glasgow District
	Preview; Report

Murrayfield Stadium

South:
Glasgow District:

== Matches outwith the Championship ==
=== Trial matches ===
7 January 1984

Blues Trial	3 - 21	Whites Trial
	Report; Report

Murrayfield Stadium
Referee: A. M. Hosie (Hillhead)

Blues:
Whites:
