= John Tulloch (rugby union) =

Scottish rugby union player

- Born: John T. Tulloch
- Died: 1943

Rugby union career
- Position: Three Quarters
Amateur team(s)
Years	Team	Apps	(Points)
1901	Kelvinside Academicals		
Provincial / State sides
Years	Team	Apps	(Points)
1899-1901	Cities District		
1900	Glasgow District		
Refereeing career
Years	Competition		Apps
1906	Scottish Districts		
1907-24	Home Nations		

33rd President of the Scottish Rugby Union
- In office 1906–1907
- Preceded by: Willie Neilson
- Succeeded by: Andrew Flett

John Tulloch was a Scottish rugby union player. He later became an international referee and was the 33rd President of the Scottish Rugby Union. He also served as a Director and Chairman of the Royal Bank of Scotland.

== Rugby Union career ==
=== Amateur career ===
Tulloch played with Kelvinside Academicals.

He had to resign from the captaincy and his playing career after an injury he sustained playing against Royal HSFP on 5 October 1901. It was remarked that Tulloch was one of the best Three Quarters had Scotland had produced for many years; and that the injury was more serious than originally anticipated. John Knox would take over the captaincy of the club.

=== Provincial career ===
Tulloch played in 1900 inter-city match for Glasgow District

Tulloch played for the Cities District in 1899. He played again for Cities in 1901. He suffered an injury and strained his tendon.

=== International career ===
He was twice selected for Scotland but on both occasions injury ruined his chances of a Scotland cap.

Tulloch was due to get a Scotland cap against Wales in 1899 after impressing in the Cities versus Provinces match and was in the original selection. The Scottish Referee journalist concluded that 'J. T Tulloch has earned his place through sheer merit and I would be terribly disappointed if he did not add to his reputation in the Wales match'.

Due to the injury Tulloch picked up in the 1901 Cities v Provinces match, although he was originally selected for Scotland duty Tulloch had to withdraw from the Scotland Home Nations side. A. N. Fell was selected in his place.

=== Referee career ===
After Tulloch's playing career was ended abruptly due to injury he became an international referee. He refereed Scottish Districts matches.

He refereed 9 test matches in all.

One famous match he was scheduled to referee - but did not - was the Ireland v South Africa match of 1912. The Scottish Rugby Union offered Tulloch when the English referee Frank Potter-Irwin fell sick. Some reports still have Tulloch refereeing the first half; but in fact it was John Dallas, another Scottish referee, that took Tulloch's place. The match was notable, not only for a South Africa emphatic win, but because Dallas could not continue for the second half and an Irish referee had to take over for the second half. It was the first time a referee was substituted in a test match.

Tulloch did referee the England v South Africa match of the 1912-13 season tour.

=== Administrative career ===
Tulloch became the Vice-President of the Scottish Rugby Union in 1905.

He became the 33rd President of the Scottish Rugby Union. He served one year from 1906 to 1907.

== Financial career ==
Tulloch became a Charted Accountant. He became a Director of the Royal Bank of Scotland; and served as the Bank's chairman of the board for two terms. He resigned his position of Ordinary Board Member in March 1943 due to ill-health; but was then immediately elected an Extraordinary Board Member.

Tulloch died later that year. The bank stated: we mourn the loss of a valued colleague of engaging personality whose wide experience of men and affairs was always at the service of the bank. The following year Lord Elgin gave a moving eulogy to Tulloch and quoted a poem by Henry van Dyke Jr. to honour him.

== Outside of rugby and finance ==
Tulloch was added as a Director of Kelvinside Academy in December 1913, alongside James Greenlees. Another famous Scottish rugby union player Douglas Schulze was the Academy rector at the time.

Tulloch gave a lot of his time to the Boys Brigade. A company officer, he then became Treasurer and finally President of the Glasgow battalion.
