= Tennant Sloan =

Scotland international rugby union player

Sir Tennant Sloan, KCIE, CSI (9 November 1884 – 15 October 1972) was a British colonial administrator in India and Scotland international rugby union player.

== Biography ==
Educated at the Glasgow Academy, Glasgow University, and Christ Church, Oxford, Sloan joined the Indian Civil Service, retiring as adviser to the Governor of the United Provinces in 1945. He was appointed CIE in 1930, CSI in 1936, and knighted KCIE in 1942.

== Rugby Union career ==
Tennant Sloan
- Born: Tennant Sloan; 9 November 1884 Glasgow, Scotland
- Died: 15 October 1972 (aged 87) Edinburgh, Scotland

Rugby union career
- Position: Centre
Amateur team(s)
| Years | Team | Apps | (Points) |
- Glasgow Academicals
Provincial / State sides
| Years | Team | Apps | (Points) |
- Glasgow District
International career
| Years | Team | Apps | (Points) |
| 1905-09 | Scotland | 7 | (0) |

=== Amateur career ===
Sloan played for Glasgow Academicals.

=== Provincial career ===
He was capped by Glasgow District in 1906.

=== International career ===
Sloan was capped for Scotland in 1905.
