= David Cassels =

Scotland international rugby union player

- Born: David Young Cassels; 4 March 1859 Shettleston, Scotland
- Died: 25 January 1923 (aged 63) Glasgow, Scotland

Rugby union career
- Position: Forward
Amateur team(s)
Years	Team	Apps	(Points)
-	West of Scotland		
Provincial / State sides
Years	Team	Apps	(Points)
1879-81	Glasgow District		
1880-81	West of Scotland District		
International career
Years	Team	Apps	(Points)
1880-83	Scotland	7	(0)

35th President of the Scottish Rugby Union
- In office 1908–1909
- Preceded by: Andrew Flett
- Succeeded by: Alexander Blair

David Cassels (4 March 1859 – 25 January 1923) was a Scotland international rugby union player. He was the 35th President of the Scottish Rugby Union.

== Rugby Union career ==
=== Amateur career ===
Cassels played rugby union for West of Scotland.

=== Provincial career ===
Cassels played for Glasgow District in the inter-city match of 1879 and 1880. He captained the side in 1881.

He was capped by West District in January 1880. In February 1881, he was capped by West of Scotland District for their match against East of Scotland District.

=== International career ===
Cassels had 7 caps for Scotland between 1880 and 1883.

=== Administrative career ===
Cassels became the 35th President of the Scottish Rugby Union. He served one year from 1908 to 1909.
