= 1989–90 Scottish Inter-District Championship =

Rugby union competition

- Countries: Scotland
- Date: 1989–90
- Champions: Glasgow District
- Runners-up: Anglo-Scots
- Matches played: 10

The 1989–90 Scottish Inter-District Championship was a rugby union competition for Scotland's district teams.

This season saw the 36th formal Scottish Inter-District Championship.

Glasgow District won the competition with three wins and one draw.

Preview Glasgow North u21

== 1989-90 League Table ==
Team	P	W	D	L	PF	PA	+/-	Pts
Glasgow District	4	3	1	0	78	54	+24	7
Anglo-Scots	4	3	0	1	58	51	+7	6
Edinburgh District	4	2	1	1	93	65	+28	5
South	4	1	0	3	60	84	-24	2
North and Midlands	4	0	0	4	47	82	-35	0

== Results ==
Date	Try	Conversion	Penalty	Dropped goal	Goal from mark	Notes
1977–1991	4 points	2 points	3 points	3 points	—	

=== Round 1 ===
25 November 1989

Glasgow District	19 – 19	Edinburgh District
	Report

New Anniesland
Referee: K. W. McCartney (Hawick)

Glasgow District:
Edinburgh District:

25 November 1989

South	23 – 6	North and Midlands
	Report

Netherdale, Galashiels
Referee: M. S. Clayton (Whitecraigs)

South of Scotland:
North and Midlands:

=== Round 2 ===
2 December 1989

Anglo-Scots	16 – 15	South
	Report

Imber Court, London
Referee: J. M. Fleming (Boroughmuir)

Anglo-Scots:
South of Scotland:

2 December 1989

Edinburgh District	25 – 22	North and Midlands
	Report

Goldenacre
Referee: W. W. Calder (Dalziel and Selkirk)

Edinburgh District:
North and Midlands:

=== Round 3 ===
16 December 1989

Anglo-Scots	12 – 9	Edinburgh District
	Report

Grange Road, Cambridge
Referee: A. P. Thomson (London)

Anglo-Scots:
Edinburgh District:

16 December 1989

North and Midlands	10 – 19	Glasgow District
	Report

Inverness
Referee: R. J. Megson (Edinburgh Wanderers)

North and Midlands:
Glasgow District:

=== Round 4 ===
23 December 1989

North and Midlands	–	Anglo-Scots

McKane Park, Dunfermline

North and Midlands:
Anglo-Scots:

23 December 1989

South	10 – 22	Glasgow District
	Report

The Greenyards, Melrose

South of Scotland:
Glasgow District:

=== Round 5 ===
30 December 1989

Glasgow District	–	Anglo-Scots

Burnbrae

Glasgow District:
Anglo-Scots:

30 December 1989

Edinburgh District	–	South of Scotland

Edinburgh District:
South of Scotland:

== Matches outwith the Championship ==
=== Trial matches ===
6 January 1990

Blues Trial	45 - 4	Reds Trial
	Preview; Preview; Report

Murrayfield Stadium
Referee: J. B. Anderson (Currie)

Blues:
Reds:
