= 1994–95 Scottish Inter-District Championship =

Rugby union competition

- Countries: Scotland
- Champions: Scottish Exiles
- Runners-up: Edinburgh District
- Matches played: 10

The 1994–95 Scottish Inter-District Championship rugby union Scottish Inter-District Championship saw the 'non-native' district Anglo-Scots rename their side Scottish Exiles.

== 1994-95 League Table ==
Team	P	W	D	L	PF	PA	+/-	Pts
Scottish Exiles	4	4	0	0	119	51	+68	8
Edinburgh District	4	1	2	1	62	62	0	4
North and Midlands	4	1	1	2	69	84	-15	3
South	4	1	1	2	61	81	-20	3
Glasgow District	4	1	0	3	62	95	-33	2

== Results ==
Date	Try	Conversion	Penalty	Dropped goal	Goal from mark	Notes
1992–present	5 points	2 points	3 points	3 points	—N/a	

=== Round 1 ===
3 December 1994

South	9 – 25	Exiles

Murrayfield Stadium
Attendance: 150

3 December 1994

Glasgow District	25 – 19	North and Midlands

Hughenden Stadium

=== Round 2 ===
10 December 1994

North and Midlands	11 – 11	Edinburgh District
	Report

Duffus Park

10 December 1994

Exiles	34 – 13	Glasgow District

Murrayfield Stadium

=== Round 3 ===
14 December 1994

South	19 – 19	Edinburgh District

Riverside Park, Jedburgh

=== Round 4 ===
17 December 1994

Edinburgh District	16 – 13	Glasgow District
	Report

Myreside

17 December 1994

North and Midlands	26 – 7	South

Rubislaw Playing Fields

=== Round 5 ===
21 December 1994

Exiles	41 – 13	North and Midlands

Murrayfield Stadium

Scottish Exiles:
North and Midlands: S Burns (Edinburgh Academicals); M Cousin (Dundee HSFP), P Rouse (Dundee HSFP), Rowen Shepherd (Edinburgh Academicals), F Swanson (Edinburgh Academicals); J Newton (Dundee HSFP), K Harper (Stirling County); John Manson (Dundee HSFP), M Scott (Dunfermline), Danny Herrington (Dundee HSFP), D McIvor (Edinburgh Academicals, captain), S Hamilton (Stirling County), Stewart Campbell (Dundee HSFP), Rob Wainwright (West Hartlepool), Gareth Flockhart (Stirling County).

=== Round 6 ===
23 December 1994

Edinburgh District	16 – 19	Exiles

Murrayfield Stadium
Referee: C Muir (Langholm)

24 December 1994

Glasgow District	11 – 26	South
	Report

Bridgehaugh Park, Stirling
Referee: J Bacigalupo (Edinburgh)
