= 1992–93 Scottish Inter-District Championship =

Rugby union competition

- Countries: Scotland
- Champions: South
- Runners-up: Edinburgh District
- Matches played: 10

The 1992–93 rugby union Scottish Inter-District Championship seen a name change for the Anglo-Scots. The Anglo-Scots district was later to be renamed the Scottish Exiles to better reflect the Scottish diaspora.

== 1992-93 League Table ==
| Team | P | W | D | L | PF | PA | +/- | Pts |
|---|---|---|---|---|---|---|---|---|
| South | 4 | 3 | 0 | 1 | 60 | 33 | +27 | 6 |
| Edinburgh District | 4 | 2 | 1 | 1 | 93 | 69 | +24 | 5 |
| North and Midlands | 4 | 2 | 0 | 2 | 60 | 101 | -41 | 4 |
| Glasgow District | 4 | 1 | 1 | 2 | 44 | 59 | -15 | 3 |
| Scottish Exiles | 4 | 1 | 0 | 3 | 57 | 52 | +5 | 2 |

== Results ==
| Date | Try | Conversion | Penalty | Dropped goal | Goal from mark | Notes |
|---|---|---|---|---|---|---|
| 1992–present | 5 points | 2 points | 3 points | 3 points | — | |

=== Round 1 ===
21 November 1992

| Edinburgh District | 13 – 13 | Glasgow District |
| | Report |

Goldenacre Sports Ground

21 November 1992

| North and Midlands | 3 – 26 | South |

Mayfield, Dundee

=== Round 2 ===
28 November 1992

| North and Midlands | 18 – 45 | Edinburgh District |

Countesswells, Aberdeen

28 November 1992

| Glasgow District | 9 – 7 | South |

Hughenden Stadium

=== Round 3 ===
2 December 1992

| Exiles | 17 – 7 | Glasgow District |
| | Report |

Athletic Ground, Richmond

=== Round 4 ===
5 December 1992

| South | 8 – 6 | Exiles |
| | Report |

Mansfield Park, Hawick

5 December 1992

| Glasgow District | 15 – 22 | North and Midlands |
| | Report |

Burnbrae, Milngavie

=== Round 5 ===
9 December 1992

| Edinburgh District | 20 – 19 | Exiles |

Meggetland Sports Complex

=== Round 6 ===
12 December 1992

| South | 19 – 15 | Edinburgh District |

The Greenyards, Melrose

12 December 1992

| Exiles | 15 – 17 | North and Midlands |
| | Report |

Franklin's Gardens, Northampton

== Matches outwith the Championship ==
=== Trial matches ===
2 January 1993

| Blues Trial | 29 - 6 | Reds Trial |
| | Report |

Murrayfield Stadium

Blues:
Reds:
