= John Simson (rugby union) =

Scotland international rugby union player

- Born: John Thomas Simson; 21 October 1884 Edinburgh, Scotland
- Died: 30 March 1976 (aged 91)

Rugby union career
- Position: Wing
Amateur team(s)
Years	Team	Apps	(Points)
- Edinburgh University
–	Watsonians		
Provincial / State sides
Years	Team	Apps	(Points)
- Edinburgh District
International career
Years	Team	Apps	(Points)
1905-11	Scotland	7	(6)

John Simson (10 October 1884 – 30 March 1976) was a Scotland international rugby union player. He played at the Wing position.

== Rugby Union career ==
=== Amateur career ===
Simson played for Edinburgh University. He later moved to Watsonians.

=== Provincial career ===
He was capped by Edinburgh District in 1906.

=== International career ===
Simson was capped by Scotland for 7 matches.
