= Half back =

A halfback, half back, or half-back may refer to:

- Stand-off, in rugby league football
- Halfback (rugby league)
- Half-back (rugby union)
  - Fly-half (rugby union)
  - Scrum-half (rugby union)
- Half back (association football), an obsolete position
  - Centre-back
  - Wing half
- Halfback (American football), a type of running back
- Halfback (Canadian football), a type of defensive back
- Half-back line, in Australian rules football

== See also ==
- Fullback (disambiguation)
- Quarterback
- Three-quarter back
