= 1995–96 Scottish Inter-District Championship =

Rugby union competition

- Countries: Scotland
- Champions: Scottish Exiles
- Runners-up: Edinburgh District
- Matches played: 10

The 1995–96 Scottish Inter-District Championship rugby union Scottish Inter-District Championship was the last between the Scottish districts at amateur level, before the game turned professional in Scotland in the summer of 1996; although later amateur Inter-District championship matches were also played in seasons when the Scottish professional districts were playing in the Welsh-Scottish League.

The Scottish Exiles team won this last amateur era district tournament. Indeed, it was the Scottish Exiles second only outright title in their history, since the Scottish Inter-District Championship began in 1953-54.

However, as not a 'native' district they could not compete in European competition, as it was decided that Scottish districts would be entered in the new European tournaments.

The Exiles were excluded from subsequent professional Scottish Inter-District Championships for that reason, as the inter-district league places were used to determine qualification for European places.

At the end of this season, the 'native' amateur districts turned professional. Edinburgh District became Edinburgh Rugby, South became Border Reivers, North and Midlands became Caledonia Reds and Glasgow District eventually became Glasgow Warriors.

This season's top 3 'native' districts Edinburgh District, North and Midlands and South qualified for the 1996-97 Heineken Cup as Edinburgh, Caledonia Reds and the Border Reivers. In last place, Glasgow District qualified for the secondary European tournament, the European Conference, as Glasgow.

== 1995-96 League Table ==
| Team | P | W | D | L | PF | PA | +/- | Pts |
|---|---|---|---|---|---|---|---|---|
| Scottish Exiles | 4 | 4 | 0 | 0 | 100 | 50 | +50 | 8 |
| Edinburgh District | 4 | 2 | 0 | 2 | 109 | 82 | +27 | 4 |
| North and Midlands | 4 | 2 | 0 | 2 | 95 | 72 | +23 | 4 |
| South | 4 | 2 | 0 | 2 | 80 | 82 | -2 | 4 |
| Glasgow District | 4 | 0 | 0 | 4 | 63 | 161 | -98 | 0 |

== Results ==
| Date | Try | Conversion | Penalty | Dropped goal | Goal from mark | Notes |
|---|---|---|---|---|---|---|
| 1992–present | 5 points | 2 points | 3 points | 3 points | — | |

=== Round 1 ===
| Scottish Exiles | 17 – 6 | Edinburgh District |

| North and Midlands | 53 – 18 | Glasgow District |

=== Round 2 ===
| Glasgow District | 27 – 28 | Scottish Exiles |

| South | 18 – 12 | North and Midlands |

=== Round 3 ===
| Edinburgh District | 31 – 30 | South |

| North and Midlands | 8 – 21 | Scottish Exiles |

=== Round 4 ===
| South | 23 – 5 | Glasgow District |

=== Round 5 ===
| Edinburgh District | 57 – 13 | Glasgow District |

| Scottish Exiles | 34 – 9 | South |

=== Round 6 ===
| Edinburgh District | 15 – 22 | North and Midlands |
| | Preview; Report |

Edinburgh District:
North and Midlands: R Shepherd (Melrose); N Renton (Kirkcaldy), P Rouse (Dundee HSFP), A Carruthers (Kirkcaldy), J Kerr (Watsonians); Mark McKenzie (Stirling County), K Harper (Stirling County); Willie Anderson (Stirling County), Kevin McKenzie (Stirling County), D Herrington (Kirkcaldy), Stuart Grimes (Watsonians), S Hamilton (Stirling County), Dave McIvor (Edinburgh Acads) captain, G Flockhart (Stirling County), R Wainwright (West Hartlepool).Replacements: S Burns (Edinburgh Academicals), B Easson (Boroughmuir), M Fraser (Stirling County), Martin Waite (Edinburgh Academicals), A Penman (Grangemouth), R Cairney (Stirling County).
