= Louis Moritz Speirs =

British Lions & Scotland international rugby union player

Moritz Speirs
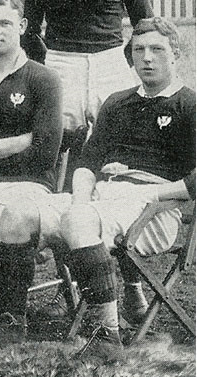
- L M Speirs with the Scotland national rugby union team for their 16-10 win over England on 21 March 1908.
- Born: Louis Moritz Speirs; 23 October 1885 Glendevon, Perthshire, Scotland
- Died: 21 April 1949 (aged 63)
- School: George Watson's College

Rugby union career
- Position: Forward
Amateur team(s)
Years	Team	Apps	(Points)
- Watsonians
Provincial / State sides
Years	Team	Apps	(Points)
- Edinburgh District
- Cities District
1911	Blues Trial		
International career
Years	Team	Apps	(Points)
1906-10	Scotland	10	
1910	British & Irish Lions		

Louis Moritz Speirs was a Scottish rugby union international who played ten times for his country and was part of the first official British & Irish Lions team that toured South Africa in 1910.

== Early life ==
Louis Moritz Speirs was born on 23 October 1885 in Glendevon, Perthshire, Scotland, the son of Ebenezer B. Speirs, the minister of Glendevon Parish, and his wife Marie, born in Ronilly, West Prussia. Sometime between 1891 and 1901 his father died and the family moved to the Morningside area of Edinburgh. Here, the young Moritz, as he was referred to, attended to school.

== Rugby Union career ==
=== Amateur career ===
Speirs played for the Watsonians, originally the club for the old boys of George Watson's College. He was part of the clubest historically greatest side that won five Scottish Unofficial Championships between 1908 and 1914. In the 1909/10 season he was a member of the team that was undefeated against Scottish opposition during that entire season.

=== Provincial career ===
He was capped for Edinburgh District to play against Glasgow District in the inter-city match of 1906.

That same season, Speirs was further capped byt the Cities District side in early 1907.

He played for the Blues Trial side against the Whites Trial side on 21 January 1911 while still with Watsonians.

=== International career ===
Speirs made his Test debut for Scotland vs South Africa at Glasgow on 17 November 1906. He played in a further nine matches for his country between 1906 and 1910 all of which were in the Five Nations tournament. His last Test being a Calcutta Cup match against England at Inverleith on 19 March 1910. In 1910 he was selected for the first official British tour to South Africa (in that it was sanctioned and selected by the four Home Nations official governing bodies).

== Later life and military ==
In 1912 Speirs emigrated to Canada. However, during the First World War he enlisted in the Canadian 16th Battalion and found himself back across the Atlantic. On 16 January 1915 he captained a Canadian Army rugby union side against a Bath XV during which he dislocated his shoulder. However, he was able to later join his teammates at the Red House where Bath Football Club were entertaining them before going on to a pantomime. He was captured during the war and escaped from a POW camp in 1918.
