= Alexander Blair (rugby union) =

Scottish rugby union player & ru administrator

Alexander Blair CBE CMG TD
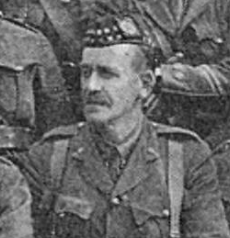
- Blair as a lieutenant-colonel, 1915
- Born: Alexander Stevenson Blair; 3 June 1865 Edinburgh, Scotland
- Died: 10 September 1936 (aged 60) Edinburgh, Scotland
- School: Loretto School
- University: Brasenose College, Oxford

Rugby union career
- Position: Three Quarters
Amateur team(s)
Years	Team	Apps	(Points)
- Oxford University

36th President of the Scottish Rugby Union
- In office 1909–1910
- Preceded by: David Cassels
- Succeeded by: Charles Fleming

Alexander Stevenson Blair was a Scottish rugby union player. He was the 36th President of the Scottish Rugby Union. He became a lieutenant-colonel in the army and then became president of the British Legion and chairman of the Earl Haig Fund. An advocate to trade he was a Writer to the Signet. He was appointed a Commander of the Order of the British Empire in the New Years Honours List of 1933.

== Rugby Union career ==
=== Amateur career ===
After attending Loretto School, Blair went to Brasenose College in Oxford. He played for Oxford University, and was in the 1st XV. He was secretary of both the rugby and athletics club of the university.

=== Administrative career ===
He was Secretary of the Scottish Rugby Union for 4 years from 1886.

Blair was on the International Rugby Board in 1889.

He became the 36th President of the Scottish Rugby Union. He served one year from 1909 to 1910.

== Military career ==
First as Lieutenant Colonel, then Colonel, Blair commanded the 'Dandy Ninth', the Lothian Regiment of the Royal Scots, in the First World War. In 1916 he was awarded a CMG.

After the war he joined the British Legion where he became treasurer in Scotland.

== Law career ==
Blair's firm, Strathearn and Blair, acted as solicitors for the Scottish Rugby Union. Blair was a Writer to the Signet.

== Death ==
He is buried in Dean Cemetery in Edinburgh.
