= 2000–01 Amateur Scottish Inter-District Championship =

Rugby union competition

- Countries: Scotland
- Champions: Scottish Exiles
- Runners-up: Scottish Borders
- Matches played: 6

The 2000–2001 Amateur Scottish Inter-District Championship was a rugby union competition for Scotland's amateur district teams.

This was the second season of the re-instated amateur Scottish Inter-District Championship. This was played in the professional era, but was intended as a stepping stone for amateurs to the professional game in Scotland.

The Scottish Exiles side re-entered the Inter-District Championship as an amateur district side.

== 2000-2001 League Table ==
Team	P	W	D	L	PF	PA	+/-	TBP	LBP	Pts
Scottish Exiles	4	4	0	0	89	58	+31	1	0	17
Scottish Borders	4	2	0	2	130	96	+34	4	0	12
Edinburgh District	4	2	0	2	94	86	+8	2	0	11
Glasgow District	4	2	0	2	50	100	-50	0	0	8
Caledonia	4	0	0	4	69	92	-23	0	4	4

== Results ==
=== Round 1 ===
30 January 2001

Caledonia (Scotland)	16 – 18	(Scotland) Scottish Exiles

Bridgehaugh

Caledonia:
Scottish Exiles:

30 January 2001

Glasgow District (Scotland)	18 – 7	(Scotland) Edinburgh District

Hughenden

Glasgow District:
Edinburgh District:

=== Round 2 ===
27 February 2001

Caledonia (Scotland)	14 – 15	(Scotland) Glasgow District

Duffus Park

Caledonia:
Glasgow District:

27 February 2001

Edinburgh District (Scotland)	34 – 29	(Scotland) Scottish Borders

Murrayfield Stadium

Edinburgh District:
Scottish Borders:

=== Round 3 ===
2 May 2001

Glasgow District (Scotland)	6 – 20	(Scotland) Scottish Exiles

Burnbrae
Referee: M Hall (Boroughmuir)

Glasgow District: K Baillie; S Little, A Gibbon, S Petrie, P Price; F Sinclair, I Monaghan; A Cowan, C Docherty, G Sykes, I Smith, C Afuakwah, S Hutton, N McKenzie, J Shaw.
Scottish Exiles: B Hinshelwood; C Aitken, A Craig, S Manson, A McLean; C Day, K Dungait; J Kelly, I McIntosh, D Porte, D Whitehead, N Mitchell, N Broughton, C Malone, C Houston

2 May 2001

Scottish Borders (Scotland)	28 – 25	(Scotland) Caledonia
	Preview; Report

Poynder Park
Referee: J Yuill (Biggar)

Scottish Borders: C Richards; C Murray, S Paterson, G Hill, G Douglas; S Nichol, K Reid; I Cornwall, M Landels, D Paxton, I Elliot, S McLeod, J Szkudro, J Henderson, B Keown
Caledonia: M Fraser; S Pearson, C Goodall, M McGrandles, B Price; D Adamson, G Young; T Gordon-Duff, D McKinley, W Anderson, J Syme, K Fraser, S Hannah, C McDonald, J Mackenzie

=== Round 4 ===
9 May 2001

Scottish Exiles (Scotland)	25 – 22	(Scotland) Edinburgh District

Richmond

Scottish Exiles:
Edinburgh District:

9 May 2001

Scottish Borders (Scotland)	59 – 11	(Scotland) Glasgow District

Netherdale

Scottish Borders:
Glasgow District:

=== Round 5 ===
16 May 2001

Scottish Exiles (Scotland)	26 – 14	(Scotland) Edinburgh District

Richmond

Scottish Exiles:
Scottish Borders:

16 May 2001

Edinburgh District (Scotland)	31 – 14	(Scotland) Caledonia

Murrayfield

Edinburgh District:
Caledonia:
