= 1988–89 Scottish Inter-District Championship =

Rugby union competition

- Countries: Scotland
- Date: 1988–89
- Champions: Edinburgh District
- Runners-up: South
- Matches played: 10

The 1988–89 Scottish Inter-District Championship was a rugby union competition for Scotland's district teams.

This season saw the 36th formal Scottish Inter-District Championship.

Edinburgh District won the competition with four wins.

== 1988-89 League Table ==
Team	P	W	D	L	PF	PA	+/-	Pts
Edinburgh District	4	4	0	0	115	45	+70	8
South	4	3	0	1	93	58	+35	6
Anglo-Scots	4	2	0	2	89	79	+10	4
Glasgow District	4	1	0	3	56	117	-61	2
North and Midlands	4	0	0	4	27	81	-54	0

== Results ==
Date	Try	Conversion	Penalty	Dropped goal	Goal from mark	Notes
1977–1991	4 points	2 points	3 points	3 points	—	

== Matches outwith the Championship ==
=== Trial matches ===
7 January 1989

Blues Trial	45 - 4	Reds Trial
	Report

Murrayfield Stadium
Referee: J. B. Anderson (Currie)

Blues:
Reds:
