= Fullback =

Fullback or Full back may refer to:

== Sports ==
- A position in various kinds of football, including:
  - Full-back (association football), in association football (soccer), a defender playing in a wide position
  - Fullback (gridiron football), in American and Canadian football (gridiron), a position in the offensive backfield
  - Fullback (rugby league), a position behind the main line of backs in rugby league football
  - Fullback (rugby union), a position behind the main line of backs in rugby union football
  - Fullback, one of the Australian rules football positions
- A similar defence position in (field) hockey

== Other uses ==
- Sukhoi Su-34, a Russian fighter aircraft, from its NATO reporting name
- Fiat Fullback, a pickup truck based on the Mitsubishi L200

== See also ==
- Half back (disambiguation)
- Three-quarter back
