= Maurie Walter =

- Full name: Maurice Winn Walter
- Born: 4 January 1888 Yokohama, Japan
- Died: 3 September 1910 (aged 22) Worplesdon, Surrey, England
- School: Merchiston Castle School

Rugby union career
- Position: Centre
International career
Years	Team	Apps	(Points)
1906–10	Scotland	8	(6)

Maurice Winn Walter (4 January 1888 — 3 September 1910) was a Scottish international rugby union player.

Walter was born to British expatriates in Yokohama, Japan, and attended Merchiston Castle School in Edinburgh.

A centre, Walter played for London Scottish, often in partnership with national teammate Alex Purves. He made his debut for Scotland in the 1906 Home Nations, having declined an offer earlier in the tournament to represent England. His most notable contribution came in the last of his eight caps, a two-try performance to help defeat Ireland at Belfast.

Walter died of meningitis at his Worplesdon home in 1910, at the age of 22. He worked for the Hong Kong and Shanghai Banking Corporation in London and after playing a cricket match for his bank's XI began to well unwell and his condition worsened in the following days, developing into cerebral meningitis.

== See also ==
- List of Scotland national rugby union players
