= 1904–05 Scottish Districts season =

Rugby union competition

- Countries: Scotland
- Date: 1904–05
- Matches played: 1

The 1904–05 Scottish Districts season is a record of all the rugby union matches for Scotland's district teams.

== History ==
Edinburgh District beat Glasgow District in the Inter-City match.

== Results ==
Date	Try	Conversion	Penalty	Dropped goal	Goal from mark	Notes
1894–1904	3 points	2 points	3 points	4 points	4 points	

=== Inter-City ===
3 December 1904

Glasgow District	3 - 6	Edinburgh District
	Report

Hamilton Crescent, Glasgow
Referee: Adam Turnbull

Glasgow District:
Edinburgh District:

=== Other Scottish matches ===
17 December 1904

North of Scotland District	0 - 5	South-West
	Report

Aberdeen

North of Scotland:
South-West:

24 December 1904

South of Scotland District	11 - 3	Anglo-Scots
	Report; Report

Melrose

South of Scotland:
Anglo-Scots:

14 January 1905

Cities District	32 - 4	Provinces District
	Report; Report

Inverleith

Cities District:
Provinces District:

=== English matches ===
No other District matches played.

=== International matches ===
No touring matches this season.
