= John Forbes (rugby union) =

- Full name: John Lockhart Forbes
- Born: 11 April 1883 Edinburgh, Scotland
- Died: 10 February 1967 (aged 83) Edinburgh, Scotland
- Occupation: Seedsman

Rugby union career
- Position: Three–quarter
International career
Years	Team	Apps	(Points)
1905–06	Scotland	3	(0)

John Lockhart Forbes (11 April 1883 – 10 February 1967) was a Scottish international rugby union player.

Based in Edinburgh, Forbes was a Watsonians three–quarter and represented Edinburgh District. He gained three Scotland caps, debuting against Wales during the 1905 Home Nations. After his debut match, Forbes was replaced in the XV by Alec Boswell Timms, but returned to make a further two appearances in 1906.

Forbes spent his entire working life with seed company Stewart & Co, which he became chairman of in 1940. He was vice president of the Royal Caledonian Horticultural Society and received the Scottish Horticultural Medal when he retired.

== See also ==
- List of Scotland national rugby union players
