= George Sanderson (rugby union) =

- Full name: George Alfred Sanderson
- Born: 9 August 1881 Edinburgh, Scotland
- Died: 23 November 1957 (aged 76) Hammersmith, England
- School: Royal High School

Rugby union career
- Position: Forward
International career
Years	Team	Apps	(Points)
1907–08	Scotland	4	(3)

George Alfred Sanderson (9 August 1881 — 23 November 1957) was a Scottish international rugby union player.

Sanderson was born in Edinburgh and educated at Royal High School.

A forward, Sanderson made his debut for Scotland against Wales at Inverleith during the 1907 Home Nations, in which they claimed the triple crown. He played all three of Scotland's matches and contributed a try against Ireland. His fourth and final cap came the following year at Lansdowne Road.

== See also ==
- List of Scotland national rugby union players
