= William Andrew Walls =

Scotland international rugby union player

- Born: William Andrew Walls; 29 December 1859 Glasgow, Scotland
- Died: 19 February 1936 (aged 76) Prestwick, Scotland

Rugby union career
- Position: Forward
Amateur team(s)
Years	Team	Apps	(Points)
- Glasgow Academicals
Provincial / State sides
Years	Team	Apps	(Points)
- Glasgow District
International career
Years	Team	Apps	(Points)
1882-86	Scotland	10	(0)

38th President of the Scottish Rugby Union
- In office 1911–1912
- Preceded by: Charles Fleming
- Succeeded by: John Dallas

William Andrew Walls (29 December 1859 – 19 February 1936) was a Scotland international rugby union player. He became the 38th President of the Scottish Rugby Union.

== Rugby Union career ==
=== Amateur career ===
He played as a forward for Glasgow Academicals.

=== Provincial career ===
He represented Glasgow District against Edinburgh District in the world's first provincial match, the 'inter-city', on 23 November 1872.

He also represented Glasgow District against Edinburgh District in the 3 December 1881 match. This was Glasgow District's first win over Edinburgh District in the inter-city matches.

=== International career ===
Walls represented Scotland in the 1881–82 Home Nations rugby union matches and in the 1883 Home Nations Championship and subsequent Home Nations Championship till 1886.

=== Administrative career ===
He became the 38th President of the Scottish Rugby Union. He served one year from 1911 to 1912.
