= 2022–23 Amateur Scottish Inter-District Championship =

- Countries: Scotland
- Matches played: 4

The 2022–2023 Amateur Scottish Inter-District Championship is a rugby union competition for Scotland's amateur district teams.

This is the fourth season of the re-instated Amateur Scottish Inter-District Championship in the professional era, and the first championship since the last professional inter-district championship of 2002–03 season; and the first amateur championship since the last Amateur Scottish Inter-District Championship was played over 20 years previously in the 2001–02 season.

The teams involved would be the traditional sides of Glasgow District which incorporates Glasgow and the west of Scotland; Edinburgh District which incorporates the Lothians; Caledonia which incorporates the Midlands District and the North of Scotland District; and the South of Scotland District.

The format of this season's championship would not be the traditional round-robin; but a knock-out competition. The districts above would play off their 'semi-finals' for a place in the final. The losing semi-finalists would play off for the 3rd - 4th place.

The Inter-District Championship will not include Glasgow Warriors or Edinburgh Rugby professional players from the United Rugby Championship; or any players from the professional Super 6 league.

Instead players will be drawn from the Scottish amateur leagues of the Scottish Premiership and the national leagues below.

The intention of this amateur inter-district championship is to:

1. recognise players who have consistently performed with distinction for their club and provide them with an opportunity to represent their district;
2. provide an avenue for clubs to work in collaboration, strengthen relationships, and celebrate rugby in the region;
3. offer selected players and coaches a development opportunity through a higher standard of competition and;
4. provide a future selection vehicle for the Scotland Club XV international team.

The reprise of the amateur inter-district championship came about as Glasgow Hutchesons Aloysians proposed that the professional Super 6 league be scrapped so that monies freed could be directed towards the amateur clubs, and a regional club competition be re-instated. However the amendment put forward to re-instate the Inter-District Championship and thus keep the professional Super 6 league won with 72 votes to 46 votes.

A league table is included for completeness.

Braidholm, the home of Glasgow Hutchesons Aloysians, was chosen as the venue for the finals day.

== 2022-23 league table ==
Team	P	W	D	L	PF	PA	+/-	TBP	LBP	Pts
Caledonia	2	2	0	0	90	57	33	2	0	10
South of Scotland	2	1	0	1	80	49	31	2	1	7
Glasgow District	2	1	0	1	49	70	-21	0	0	4
Edinburgh District	2	0	0	2	29	72	-43	0	0	0

== Results ==
=== Semi-finals ===
9 May 2023
19:00

South of Scotland District	50–17	(Scotland) Edinburgh District
Try: Jae Linton; Dwain Patterson; Shawn Muir; Bruce McNeil; Fraser Renwick; Luke Pettie; Ronan McKean; Con: Craig Dods x 6 Pen: Craig Dods	Report	Try: Ali McCallum; Rhys Davies; Con: Jamie Loomes x 2 Pen: Jamie Loomes

Netherdale, Galashiels
Attendance: 1,514
Referee: Calum Lazenby

South of Scotland: 15. Kirk Ford 14. Dwain Patterson 13. Andrew Mitchell 12. Craig Dods 11. Ronan McKean 10. Struan Hutchison 9. Bruce Colvine 1. Shawn Muir CAPTAIN 2. Fraser Renwick 3. Nicky Little 4. Andrew McColm 5. Shaun Fairbairn 6. Bruce McNeil 7. Liam Scott 8. Jae Linton
Replacements: 16. Matt Carryer 17. Luke Pettie 18. Craig Owenson 19. Michael Badenhorst 20. Calum Renwick 21. Gareth Welsh 22. Frankie Robson 23. Donald Crawford
Edinburgh District: 15. Charlie Brett 14. Ian Sim 13. Greg Cannie 12. Neil Armstrong 11. Lewis Wells 10. Jamie Loomes 9. Aaron Porteous 8. Ruari Campbell 7. Rhys Davies CAPTAIN 6. Fin Simpson 5. Ali McCallum 4. Jamie Sword 3. Graeme Carson 2. Ryan Stewart 1. Cole Imrie
Replacements: 16. Danny Dineen 17. Chris Anderson 18. John Lascelles 19. Gregor Nelson 20. Ali Johnston 21. Cameron Lessels 22. Ben Heber 23. Benn Morris

13 May 2023
15:00

Caledonia (Scotland)	58–27	(Scotland) Glasgow District
Try: James McCaig; Max Wallace; DJ Innes x 2 Rupeni Rokoduguni; Brims; Magnus Henry; Oscar Baird; Con: Liam Brims x 6 Pen: Liam Brims x 2	Report; Report	Try: Fraser Grant x 2 Ewan Stewart; Con: Chris Hyde x 2 Pen: Chris Hyde x 2

Canal Park, Inverness
Referee: John Smith

Caledonia: 15. Adriu Muritoki 14. James McCaig 13. Max Wallace 12. DJ Innes 11. Rupeni Rokoduguni 10. Liam Brims 9. Harry Russell 1. Stephen Murray 2. Fraser Allan 3. Glen Brough 4. Jake Mills 5. Sean Blair 6. Oscar Baird 7. Sam Cardosi 8. Callum Carson
Replacements: 16. Archie Falconer 17. Euan Bissett 18. Jacon Ramsay 19. Callum MacPherson 20. Seumas Ross 21. James Imrie 22. Magnus Henry 23. Gordon Gregor
Glasgow District: 15. Chris Hyde 14. Ryan Flett 13. James Pinkerton 12. Conor Bickerstaff CO-CAPTAIN 11. Scott Bickerstaff 10. Gavin Cruickshanks 9. Fergus Johnston 1. Michael Downer 2. Paul Cairncross CO-CAPTAIN 3. Andrew Action 4. Max Crumlish 5. Adam Kerr 6. Fraser Grant 7. Ewan Stewart 8. Mark McCornick
Replacements: 16. Marc Ashdown 17. Michael Fox 18. Angus Troop 19. Dario Ewing 20. Max McFarlane 21. Gavin Cruickshanks 22. Sam Graham 23. Ben Frame

=== 3rd-4th play off ===
21 May 2023

Glasgow District (Scotland)	22 – 12	(Scotland) Edinburgh District
Try: Acton x 2 Hyde; Con: Sturgeon x 2 Pen: Sturgeon	Preview; Report	Try: Stewart; Sim; Con: Loomes

Braidholm

Glasgow District: J Pinkerton (Glasgow Hawks), S Bickerstaff (Marr), M MacFarlane (GHA), C Bickerstaff© (Marr), S Graham (Glasgow Hawks); G Cruickshanks (Glasgow Hawks), F Johnston (GHA); M Downer (Glasgow Hawks), P Cairncross© (Glasgow Hawks), A Acton (Marr), A Troop (GHK), M Crumlish (Glasgow Hawks), E Stewart (Biggar), D Ewing (GHA), F Grant (Marr)
Substitutes: M Ashdown (Glasgow Accies), D Grymkowski (Glasgow Accies), D Andrew (Marr), L McCutcheon (GHA), B Frame (GHK), C Sturgeon (Marr), R Flett (Glasgow Hawks), C Hyde (GHA)
Edinburgh District: C Brett (Currie Chieftains); P Christie (Heriot’s Blues), N Armstrong (Edinburgh Accies), G Cannie (Currie Chieftains), I Sim (Currie Chieftains); J Loomes (Edinburgh Accies), S Broad (Edinburgh Accies); C Anderson (Currie Chieftains), R Stewart (Currie Chieftains), G Carson (Currie Chieftains), A Bain (Boroughmuir), A McCallum (Currie Chieftains), R Davies© (Currie Chieftains), S Allison (Watsonians), R Campbell (Edinburgh Accies)
Substitutes: D Dineen (Heriot’s Blues), C Imrie (Edinburgh Accies), J Lascelles (Heriot’s Blues), M Keough (Heriot’s Blues), G Nelson (Currie Chieftains), C Lessels (Currie Chieftains), B Heber (Watsonians), K McGovern (Currie Chieftains)

=== Final ===
21 May 2023

Caledonia (Scotland)	32 – 30	South of Scotland District
Try: Adriu Muritoki; Callum MacPherson; Liam Brims; Harry Russell; Con: Liam Brims x 3 Pen: Liam Brims; Faulds	Preview; Report	Try: Shawn Muir; Kirk Ford; Calum Crookshanks; Michael Badenhorst; Con: Craig Dodds x 2 Pen: Craig Dodds x 2

Braidholm

Caledonia: A Muritoki (Highland); J McCaig (Currie Chieftains), M Wallace (Edinburgh Accies), D Innes (Currie Chieftains), R Rokoduguni (Highland); L Brims (Glasgow Hawks), H Russell© (Falkirk); S Murray (Highland), F Allan (Howe of Fife), G Brough (Gala) S Yarrow (Falkirk), S Blair© (Highland), C MacPherson (Stirling County), S Cardosi (Dundee Rugby), O Baird (Glasgow Hawks)
Substitutes: A Falconer (GHA), A Hain (Dundee Rugby), J Ramsay (Currie Chieftains), J Brough (Stirling County), G Gregor (Highland), J Imrie (Stirling County), G Faulds (Falkirk), S Ross (Highland)
South of Scotland District: K Ford (Hawick); D Patterson (Kelso), F Robson (Kelso), C Dods (Gala), R McKean (Hawick); S Hutchison (Melrose), B Colvine (Melrose); S Muir© (Hawick), M Carryer (Hawick), N Little (Hawick), S Fairbairn (Hawick), M Badenhorst (Musselburgh), S Graham (Hawick), C Renwick (Hawick), B McNeil (Kelso)
Substitutes: B Riddell (Selkirk), T Hope (Hawick), C Crookshanks (Melrose), A McColm (Selkirk), A Dun (Gala), G Welsh (Hawick), B Gill (Gala), S Watt (Musselburgh

== Matches outwith the Championship ==
=== Other Scottish matches ===
29 April 2023

Caledonia (Scotland)	52–7	(Scotland) Scottish Army

Duffus Park, Cupar

Caledonia:
Scottish Army:
