= Three-quarter back =

Three-quarter back is the back-line positions of wing or centre in either rugby league or rugby union.

== See also ==
- Rugby league positions
- Rugby union positions
- Half back (disambiguation)
- Quarter back
- Fullback (disambiguation)
