= 1893–94 Scottish Districts season =

Rugby union competition

- Countries: Scotland
- Date: 1893–94
- Matches played: 1

The 1893–94 Scottish Districts season is a record of all the rugby union matches for Scotland's district teams.

== History ==
Glasgow District beat Edinburgh District in the Inter-City match.

The Glasgow Herald makes the mistake of assuming every Inter-City fixture was an annual fixture in its report; in concluding that the Inter-City Glasgow - Edinburgh match started in 1858.

The East v West match was scheduled for February 1894. However it was played, as normal, at the end of January.

A joint Glasgow-Edinburgh side was selected for the first time. The team was to play a Rest Of Scotland side.

It was noted that the weather was so bad for the South v Cumberland match that few spectators turned up; and the pitch was almost unplayable. In addition two South players were replaced, as the first team players of Gala and Melrose were not represented at all: Renwick, the reserve Gala half-back; and McGregor, the captain of Gala Thistle had to be called in. These players evidently replaced Frater of Melrose and Dalgleish of Gala.

The list of fixtures for the season was reported by the Glasgow Evening Post of 6 May 1893 as:

FOOTBALL. SCOTTISH RUGBY FIXTURES.—The annual meeting of the Rugby football secretaries was held last evening at the Royal Hotel, Edinburgh. The list of representative matches arranged by J. E. Smith, honorary secretary of the Scottish Union, was presented as follows :
December 2 Inter city, Glasgow;
December 9 — Edinburgh v North, Dundee; December 9. Glasgow v South, at Galashiels
December 25 - Edinburgh and Glasgow [Cities District] v Scotland [Provinces District] at Glasgow
January 15 — North v. South at Edinburgh

== Results ==
Date	Try	Conversion	Penalty	Dropped goal	Goal from mark	Notes
1891–1894	2 points	3 points	3 points	4 points	4 points	

=== Inter-City ===
16 December 1893

Glasgow District	14 - 0	Edinburgh District
Try: Wotherspoon x 2 Dykes; Boswell; Con: Wotherspoon x 2	Report

Hamilton Crescent, Glasgow
Referee: D. G. Findlay

Glasgow District:
Edinburgh District:

=== Other Scottish matches ===
9 December 1893

South of Scotland District	6 - 0	Glasgow District
	Preview; Report; Report

Mossilee, Galashiels
Attendance: 3500

South of Scotland District:
Glasgow District:

9 December 1893

North of Scotland District	0 - 7	Edinburgh District
	Report

Forthill

North of Scotland District:
Edinburgh District:

23 December 1893

Cities	4 - 12	Provinces
	Report

Raeburn Place, Edinburgh

Cities:
Provinces:

13 January 1894

North of Scotland District	0 - 13	South of Scotland District
	Report; Report

Raeburn Place, Edinburgh
Attendance: 1000

North of Scotland District:
South of Scotland District:

20 January 1894

East of Scotland District	7 - 5	West of Scotland District
	Preview; Report; Report

Raeburn Place, Edinburgh

East of Scotland District:
West of Scotland District:

=== English matches ===
10 February 1894

South of Scotland District	0-0	Cumberland
	Preview; Report

Galashiels

South of Scotland District: Smith (Langholm) (back). Grieve (Hawick), Tom Scott (Langholm), Crozier (Jedburgh), and W. Oliver (Jedburgh) (half-backs), Mabon and W. Oliver (Jedburgh) (three-quarter-backs). Dalgleish (Galashiels)*, Cairns (Langholm), Frater (Melrose)*, Elliot (Hawick), and Hunter, Douglas. Johnstone, and Rennilson (Jedburgh). [*Replaced by Renwick (Gala) and McGregor (Gala Thistle)]
Cumberland:

=== International matches ===
No touring matches this season.
