= Andrew Flett =

Scotland international rugby union player

- Born: Andrew Binny Flett; 7 December 1875 Edinburgh, Scotland
- Died: 15 July 1961 (aged 85) Edinburgh, Scotland

Rugby union career
- Position: Forward
Amateur team(s)
Years	Team	Apps	(Points)
- Edinburgh University
Provincial / State sides
Years	Team	Apps	(Points)
1901	Edinburgh District		
International career
Years	Team	Apps	(Points)
1901-02	Scotland	5	(5)
Refereeing career
Years	Competition		Apps
1902	Scottish Districts		

34th President of the Scottish Rugby Union
- In office 1907–1908
- Preceded by: John Tulloch
- Succeeded by: David Cassels

Andrew Flett (7 December 1875 – 15 July 1961) was a Scotland international rugby union player. He was the 34th President of the Scottish Rugby Union.

== Rugby Union career ==
=== Amateur career ===
Flett played rugby union for Edinburgh University.

=== Provincial career ===
He played for Edinburgh District in the 1901 Inter-City match against Glasgow District.

=== International career ===
Flett had 5 caps for Scotland, playing in the 1901 and 1902 Home Nations Championship.

=== Referee career ===
He refereed the Glasgow District v Canada match on 20 December 1902.

=== Administrative career ===
Flett became the 34th President of the Scottish Rugby Union. He served one year from 1907 to 1908.
