= Provinces District (rugby union) =

Scottish provincial amateur rugby union team

(Scotland) Provinces
- Full name: Provinces District
- Founded: 1893; 133 years ago

Provinces District is a select Scottish provincial amateur rugby union team that draws its players from outside the Glasgow District and Edinburgh District area. It is occasionally known as the Rest of Scotland or the North-South side.

Founded in 1893, the Provinces District team - and its corresponding Cities District team - was created, thus halving Scotland's representative rugby union area in two.

== History ==
=== Formation ===
To include other players when selecting the international team, the Cities v Provinces District match was introduced by the Scottish Rugby Union in the 1893–94 season.

The match was first played on Saturday 23 December 1893. The Provinces District was deemed a 'Rest of Scotland' side; though the 'Rest of Scotland' term was fluid dependent on the opposition.

=== Introduction of the Anglo-Scots ===
The Provinces District started as just the combined districts of the North of Scotland District, Midlands District and South of Scotland District.

When the Anglo-Scots were formed, the Provinces would often just play a match against this side as well.

However, the side was later often deemed as the 'Rest of Scotland' when playing the Cities District - this was a reflection that on these occasions the Anglo-Scots were often added to the side.

== Partial list of games played against international opposition ==
Year	Date	Opponent	Venue	Result	Score	Tour
1962	28 November	Canada	Netherdale, Galashiels	Win	24 - 12	
1972	25 November	New Zealand	Mansfield Park, Hawick	Loss	6 - 26	1972–73 New Zealand rugby union tour of Britain, Ireland, France and North America

== Notable former players ==
=== Scotland Internationalists ===
- (Scotland) Cecil Abercrombie
- (Scotland) James Gowans
- (Scotland) Robert MacMillan
- (Scotland) Charles Fleming
- (Scotland) William Ritchie
