= Scottish Exiles (rugby union) =

Rugby union team

- Full name: Scottish Exiles
- Union: Scottish Rugby Union
- Founded: 1898; 128 years ago
- League: Scottish Inter-District Championship
Team kit

Scottish Exiles is a rugby union representative team featuring players selected from the Scottish diaspora. Its players were mainly based in England and as result the team was originally known as the Anglo-Scots. The team competed in the Scottish Inter-District Championship.

== Formation ==
Formed as the Anglo-Scots it was treated by the Scottish Rugby Union as a distinct non-native District side.

- Anglo-Scots v South 25 December 1898 match report

== Touring sides ==
The Anglo-Scots often played matches against international and non-international touring teams.

== Scottish Inter-District Championship ==
The Scottish Inter-District Championship was established in the 1953–54 season. The Glasgow District, Edinburgh, South and North and Midlands sides would play off to see which district was best in Scotland. The Anglo-Scots District joined the Inter-District Championship from 1981.

== Change to Scottish Exiles ==
With many Scottish players now playing further abroad than England, notably in France, the team's name was changed to better reflect the diaspora it represented in 1993. The Exiles full-back at the time, Mark Appleson, who played for London Scottish, said the name-change now properly reflected the Scottish character of the squad and now suitably downplayed where the players were currently based, coming up with the notable line:

It's great because people are less likely to think of us as Englishmen.

== Effect of professionalism ==
With the advent of professionalism in 1995, the Scottish Rugby Union realised that not even the best semi-professional Scottish club teams could compete in the new Professional Era in rugby union, which was beginning to gain great momentum in the professional leagues of the Southern Hemisphere and the Northern Hemisphere.

In an attempt to stay in touch with the leading nations the SRU formed four professional teams out of the four native amateur districts of Scotland in 1996. It was these newly professional teams that would represent Scotland in the Heineken Cup and in the Celtic League.

This meant the Scottish Exiles side was then excluded from the subsequent professional Scottish Inter-District Championship, as its players were generally based in English professional sides.

The Scottish Exiles side still plays and is used as a gateway for recognition for Scottish-Qualified players, particularly in England, to signal their availability and desire to play for the Scottish national team.

The side run a Scottish-Qualified programme to develop Scottish talent playing outwith Scotland.

== Honours ==
Won Scottish Inter-District Championship: 2 (Season 1994–95 and Season 1995–96).

These were the last two seasons before the Scottish professional rugby union era began in season 1996–97.

=== Season standings ===
==== Scottish Inter-District Championship ====
The Scottish Exiles, then as the Anglo-Scots, joined the Scottish Inter-District Championship in 1981.

They continued playing in the tournament until professionalism took hold in Scotland in 1996.

After 1996, the Scottish Inter-District Championship became a European Qualifying Tournament for the professional District sides. That meant that the Exiles could not join the Championship.

Scottish Inter-District Championship

| Season | Pos | Pld | W | D | L | F | A | +/- | BP | Pts | Notes |
|---|---|---|---|---|---|---|---|---|---|---|---|
| 1981–82 | 3rd | 3 | 1 | 0 | 2 | 46 | 44 | +2 | - | 2 | Match with North and Midlands invalid |
| 1982–83 | 2nd | 4 | 3 | 0 | 1 | 60 | 36 | +24 | - | 6 | |
| 1983–84 | 3rd | 4 | 2 | 0 | 2 | 46 | 43 | +3 | - | 4 | |
| 1984–85 | 3rd | 4 | 2 | 0 | 2 | 72 | 44 | +28 | - | 4 | |
| 1985–86 | 3rd | 4 | 2 | 0 | 2 | 67 | 58 | +9 | - | 4 | |
| 1986–87 | 3rd | 4 | 2 | 0 | 2 | 46 | 67 | -21 | - | 4 | |
| 1987–88 | 3rd | 4 | 2 | 0 | 2 | 84 | 58 | +26 | - | 4 | |
| 1988–89 | 3rd | 4 | 2 | 0 | 2 | 89 | 79 | +10 | - | 4 | |
| 1989–90 | 2nd | 4 | 3 | 0 | 1 | 58 | 51 | +7 | - | 6 | |
| 1990–91 | 4th | 4 | 1 | 0 | 3 | 35 | 55 | -20 | - | 2 | |
| 1991–92 | 6th | 2 | 0 | 0 | 2 | 16 | 50 | -34 | - | 0 | Abbreviated tournament - no winner |
| 1992–93 | 5th | 4 | 1 | 0 | 3 | 57 | 52 | +5 | - | 2 | |
| 1993–94 | - | - | - | - | - | - | - | - | - | - | Did not compete |
| 1994–95 | 1st | 4 | 4 | 0 | 0 | 119 | 51 | +68 | - | 8 | |
| 1995–96 | 1st | 4 | 4 | 0 | 0 | 100 | 50 | +50 | - | 8 | |

===== Professional Era =====
The Amateur Scottish Inter-District Championship has been restarted twice in the professional era. The first restart was from 1999 to 2002; the second restart from the 2022-23 season.

| Season | Pos | Pld | W | D | L | F | A | +/- | BP | Pts | Notes |
|---|---|---|---|---|---|---|---|---|---|---|---|
| 1999–2000 | - | - | - | - | - | - | - | - | - | - | Did not compete |
| 2000–01 | 1st | 4 | 4 | 0 | 0 | 89 | 58 | +31 | 1 | 17 | |
| 2001–02 | 3rd | 4 | 2 | 0 | 2 | 91 | 74 | +17 | 1 | 9 | |
| 2022–23 | - | - | - | - | - | - | - | - | - | - | Did not compete |

== Partial list of games played against international opposition ==
- 14 November 1979 Anglo Scots v New Zealand, Dundee
- 21 September 1982 Anglo Scots v Fiji, Hughenden Stadium, Glasgow

== Notable former players ==
=== Scotland Internationalists ===
- (Scotland) Ronald Stevenson
- (Scotland) Frank Fasson
- (Scotland) Douglas Monypenny
- (Scotland) Hector Forsayth
- (Scotland) Tim Exeter
- (Scotland) George Campbell
- (Scotland) James Greenlees
- (Scotland) Doug Keller
- (Scotland) William Morrison
- (Scotland) John Crabbie
- (Scotland) Graham Kerr
- (Scotland) Sam Skinner
- (Scotland) John Bell
- (Scotland) George Cunningham
- (Scotland) Andrew MacKinnon
- (Scotland) David Thom
- (Scotland) William Ritchie

=== Notable non-Scottish players ===
The following is a list of notable non-Scottish international representative former Scottish Exiles players:

Australia

- (Australia) Doug Keller

South Africa

- (South Africa) Harry Roberts

Wales

- (Wales) Dale McIntosh

== See also ==
- Home Scots v Anglo-Scots (association football)
- Irish Exiles (rugby union team)
