= Cities District (rugby union) =

Scottish rugby union team

(Scotland) Cities
- Full name: Cities District
- Founded: 1893; 133 years ago

Cities District is a select Scottish provincial amateur rugby union team that draws its players from Glasgow District and Edinburgh District. It is occasionally known as the Glasgow-Edinburgh District side.

Founded in 1893, the Cities District team - and its corresponding Provinces District team - was created, thus halving Scotland's representative rugby union area in two.

== History ==
=== Formation ===
To include other players when selecting the international team, the Cities v Provinces District match was introduced by the Scottish Rugby Union in the 1893–94 season.

The match was first played on Saturday 23 December 1893. The Provinces District was deemed a 'Rest of Scotland' side; though the 'Rest of Scotland' term was fluid dependent on the opposition.

== Recent matches ==
The most recent Cities District match was an Under 23 side that faced Black Lion from Tbilisi in Georgia on 25 April 2024 in Edinburgh. Black Lion won that match 38 - 0.

== Partial list of games played against international opposition ==
Year	Date	Opponent	Venue	Result	Score	Tour
1935	16 October	New Zealand	Old Anniesland, Glasgow	Loss	8 - 9	1935–36 New Zealand rugby union tour of Britain, Ireland and Canada
1947	15 October	Australia	Old Anniesland, Glasgow	Loss	9 - 23	1947–48 Australia rugby union tour of Britain, Ireland, France and North America
1951	31 October	South Africa	Old Anniesland, Glasgow	Loss	11 - 43	1951–52 South Africa rugby union tour of Europe
1953	25 November	New Zealand	Old Anniesland, Glasgow	Loss	3 - 23	1953–54 New Zealand rugby union tour of Britain, Ireland, France and North America
1957	4 December	Australia	Old Anniesland, Glasgow	Loss	3 - 9	1957–58 Australia rugby union tour of Britain, Ireland and France
1960	16 November	South Africa	Old Anniesland, Glasgow	Loss	11- 16	1960–61 South Africa rugby union tour of Europe
1963	20 November	New Zealand	Hughenden Stadium, Glasgow	Loss	3 - 33	1963–64 New Zealand rugby union tour of Britain, Ireland, France and North America
1966	16 November	Australia	Hughenden Stadium, Glasgow	Loss	11 - 18	1966–67 Australia rugby union tour of Britain, Ireland and France
1972	12 December	New Zealand	Hughenden Stadium, Glasgow	Loss	10 - 16	1972–73 New Zealand rugby union tour of Britain, Ireland, France and North America
1973	14 November	Argentina	Hughenden Stadium, Glasgow	Win	18 - 13	1973 Argentina rugby union tour of Ireland and Scotland
1994	15 November	South Africa Development XV	Hughenden Stadium, Glasgow			
1996	3 November	Australia	Old Anniesland, Glasgow	Loss	19 - 37	1996 Australia rugby union tour of Europe

== Notable former players ==
=== Scotland Internationalists ===
- (Scotland) George Cunningham
- (Scotland) Angus Black
- (Scotland) James Bishop
- (Scotland) Jock Scott
- (Scotland) William Thomson
- (Scotland) John Bell
- (Scotland) Louis Moritz Speirs
- (Scotland) Ranald Macdonald
- (Scotland) Henry Menzies
- (Scotland) Hamish Dawson
- (Scotland) Douglas Elliot
- (Scotland) William Cownie
