= 1985 Scotland rugby union tour of North America =

Summary
P	W	D	L
Total
5	4	0	1

The 1985 Scotland rugby union tour of North America was a series of nine matches played by the Scotland national rugby union team in Canada and the United States in May 1985. The Scotland team won four of their matches and lost one. Four of the five matches were played in Canada, and Scotland did not play either the Canada national rugby union team or the United States national rugby union team.

== Matches ==
Scores and results list Scotland's points tally first.

Opponent	Result	For	Against	Date	Venue
Vancouver Island	Won	20	10	8 May	Victoria
British Columbia	Lost	13	22	11 May	Vancouver
Pacific Coast Grizzlies	Won	32	6	14 May	Seattle
Canadian Wolverines	Won	62	6	18 May	Edmonton
Alberta	Won	79	0	22 May	Calgary

== Touring party ==
- Manager: G. B. Masson
- Coach: Colin Telfer
- Assistant Manager: Derrick Grant
- Captain: David Leslie

=== Backs ===
- Peter Dods
- Gavin Hastings
- Peter Steven
- Iwan Tukalo
- Brian Edwards
- Keith Murray
- Alan Tait
- Douglas Wyllie
- Colin Gass
- Andrew Ker
- D. Bryson
- D. MacDonald

=== Forwards ===
- John Jeffrey
- David Leslie
- Sean McGaughey
- Iain Paxton
- Derek Turnbull
- Alister Campbell
- Hugh Parker
- Tom Smith
- Alan Tomes
- Rob Cunningham
- Kenny Milne
- Alex Brewster
- Iain Milne
- Norrie Rowan
