= 1990 Scotland rugby union tour of New Zealand =

- Manager: D S Paterson
- Tour captain: David Sole
Summary
P	W	D	L
Total
8	5	1	2
Test match
2	0	0	2
Opponent
P	W	D	L
New Zealand
2	0	0	2

The 1990 Scotland rugby union tour of New Zealand involved eight rugby union matches played between 30 May and 23 June by the Scotland national rugby union team in New Zealand. It was the third tour of New Zealand by Scotland, who won five matches and drew one, but lost the two test matches against the All Blacks. This was the first time that a Scotland team had been unbeaten in international matches, except on a tour to the Southern Hemisphere.

== Matches ==
Scores and results list Scotland's points tally first.

Opponent	Result	For	Against	Date	Venue
Poverty Bay-East Coast	Won	45	0	30 May	Rugby Park, Gisborne
Wellington	Drew	16	16	2 June	Athletic Park, Wellington
Nelson Bays-Marlborough	Won	23	6	6 June	Trafalgar Park, Nelson
Canterbury	Won	21	12	9 June	Lancaster Park, Christchurch
Southland	Won	45	12	12 June	Homestead Stadium, Invercargill
NEW ZEALAND	Lost	16	31	16 June	Carisbrook, Dunedin
Manawatu	Won	19	4	19 June	The Showground, Palmerston North
NEW ZEALAND	Lost	18	21	23 June	Eden Park, Auckland

== Touring party ==
- Manager: D. S. Paterson
- Coach: Ian McGeechan
- Assistant coach: Derrick Grant
- Captain: David Sole

=== Backs ===
- Peter Dods
- Gavin Hastings
- Alex Moore
- Stewart Porter
- Tony Stanger
- Iwan Tukalo
- Scott Hastings
- Sean Lineen
- Craig Redpath
- Graham Shiel
- Craig Chalmers
- Douglas Wyllie
- Gary Armstrong
- Greig Oliver

=== Forwards ===
- Derek White
- Alex Brewster
- Paul Burnell
- Iain Milne
- David Sole
- John Allan
- Kenny Milne
- Damian Cronin
- Chris Gray
- Jeremy Richardson
- Doddie Weir
- George Buchanan-Smith
- Finlay Calder
- John Jeffrey
- Derek Turnbull
- Graham Marshall

== See also ==
- History of rugby union matches between New Zealand and Scotland
