= History of rugby union in Scotland =

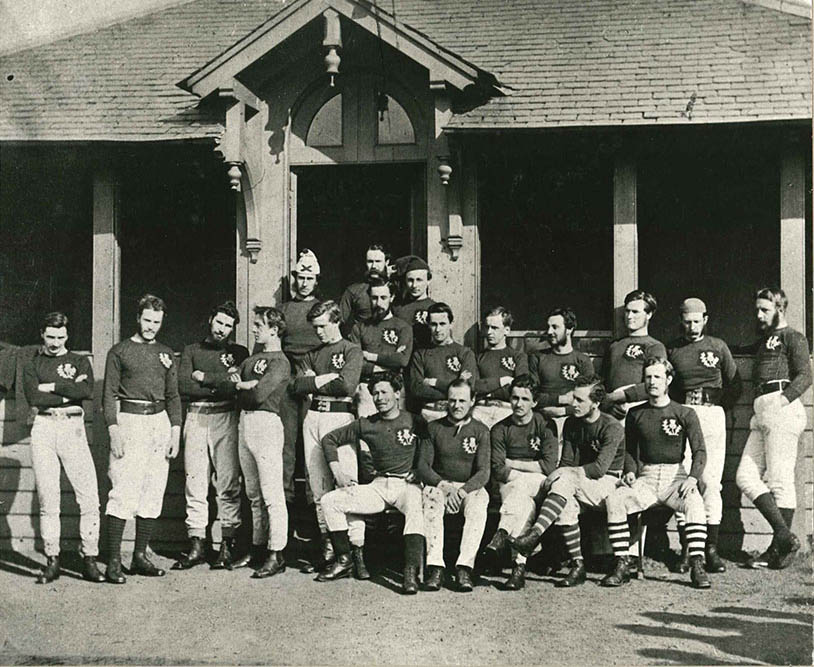
Scotland's First National Rugby Team, 1871, for the 1st international, v England in Edinburgh. Scotland won by 1 goal & 1 try to 1 try

Rugby union in Scotland in its modern form has existed since the mid-19th century. Scotland has one of the oldest rugby union traditions and has introduced various innovations including rugby sevens.

As with the history of rugby union itself however, it emerged from older traditional forms of football which preceded the codification of the sport. In the same manner as rugby union in England, rugby union in Scotland would grow at a significant rate to the point where Scotland played England in the first ever rugby union international in 1871, a match which was won by the Scottish team.

In 1883, Scotland would become a founding member of the annual Home Nations Championship with England, Wales and Ireland, (now the Six Nations Championship with the inclusion of France and Italy), and since its creation in 1987 have competed in every Rugby World Cup. Scotland took part in co-hosting the 1991 Rugby World Cup, alongside the rest of the United Kingdom, Ireland and France. The governing body of rugby union in Scotland, Scottish Rugby Union, is the second oldest organisation of its kind, having been founded in 1873.

== Early history ==
=== Earliest rugby games ===
Until the mid-nineteenth century the distinction between rugby football and association football (soccer) did not exist in Scotland so both codes share the same history.

There is a long tradition of "football" games in Scotland, and many of these such as Jeddart Ba' bear more resemblance to rugby than association football, since passing and carrying by hand play a large part in them.

The Kirkwall Ba game still takes place, and involves scrummaging. Scottish soccer enthusiasts also cite these games as ancestral to their sport, despite their greater similarity to rugby.

=== Unregulated School rugby ===
Several new schools were formed in Scotland during the first half of the 19th century, among them The Edinburgh Academy (1824), Loretto (1827), Merchiston (1833), Glasgow Academy (1845) and Trinity College, Glenalmond (1847). It is known that unregulated forms of football were played at all of these schools, but it was in Edinburgh that the handling game first took root and spread to other areas of the country.

== Codified rugby comes to Scotland ==
=== Edinburgh Academy and the Crombies ===
Two young men, Francis Crombie and Alexander Crombie, came from Durham School to Edinburgh in 1854. Francis joined the academy as a pupil, but Alexander had already left school. Apparently, the boys brought the knowledge of football from Durham School, and this they passed on. Francis is recorded as having been the first school football captain, and Alexander became actively involved in the formation of The Edinburgh Academical Football Club. He qualified for membership under a rule that allowed relatives of school pupils to become members. In 1858, he became the first captain of the Football Club - a position he held for eight years.

=== The High School in Edinburgh and Hamilton ===
During the same period, a boy named Hamilton came to the High School in Edinburgh (in 1856) from an English private school and brought with him the 'Rules of Rugby Football' as he had known them from south of the Border. This document was instrumental in the High School's adaptation of their existing game to this new form.

=== First ever Schools match ===
The first-ever inter-school match recorded in Scotland was Royal High School versus Merchiston (in Edinburgh), played on 13 February 1858. However, the game suffered from a lack of uniformity of rule and the ball.

=== Standardisation of rules ===
In the High School, in the early 1860s, football was played with '...monstrous inflated globes of vast circumference and ponderosity...'.

H. H. Almond, a master at both Loretto and Merchiston, and a founding father of the game in Scotland, describing an incident in a Loretto versus Merchiston match, wrote: '...but so little did any of us, masters or boys, then know about it, that I remember how, when Lyall ran with the ball behind the Merchiston goal the resulting try was appealed against on the ground that no player may cross the line whilst holding the ball. The previous rule at Merchiston had been that he must let go of the ball and kick it over before he touched it down. It must be said in excuse for this and other similar sins of ignorance that the only available rules were those printed for the use of Rugby School. They were very incomplete and presupposed a practical knowledge of the game.'

==== Disputes ====
Gradually, over several years, the game approached that then being played at Rugby. There were local variations which, inevitably, resulted in disputes.

H.H. Almond: 'Well into the 1870s, the only schools able to play each other on even terms were The Edinburgh Academy, Merchiston, and The High School.'

From the mid-1860s, senior (former pupils) clubs started to appear in both the Edinburgh and Glasgow areas, and these clubs, making good use of the then-new railways, began to play each other. In those early club matches, play was often halted whilst captains and umpires tried to settle some point of difference. Such disputes and mix-ups were frequent.

Such a state of affairs could not continue indefinitely, and a group of men from The Edinburgh Academical Football Club convened a series of meetings and, in 1868, with the agreement of the other schools and clubs, set out and had printed rules for the game in Scotland.

==== The Green Book ====
The resulting booklet, Laws of Football as played by the Principal Clubs in Scotland, became known as The Green Book. Alas, no copy survives, but it is worthy of note that neither the clubs nor The Green Book felt it necessary to include the word 'Rugby' in their title. Indeed, the Scottish Football Union, formed in 1873, did not alter its name to become the Scottish Rugby Union until 1924 - the year prior to the opening of Murrayfield.

=== Oldest continual fixture ===
The world's oldest continual rugby fixture was first played in 1858 between Merchiston Castle School and the former pupils of The Edinburgh Academy, although the 'Edinburgh Courant' journal of Jan 1858 describes a Rugby Football match of December 1857 between sides representing 'The university' (Edinburgh) and 'The Academical Club' (Edinburgh Academicals FC).

== 1871 to 1924 ==
=== The first ever international ===
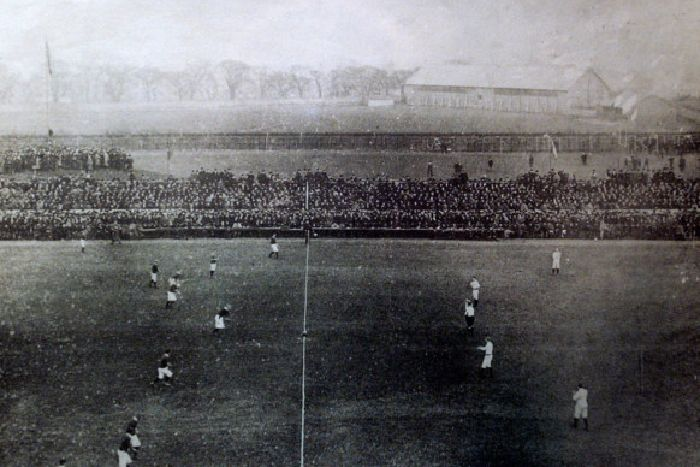
Scene of the first international, Scotland v England, 28 March 1871

The first international rugby football game resulted from a challenge issued in the sporting weekly Bell's Weekly on 8 December 1870 and signed by the captains of five Scottish clubs, inviting any team "selected from the whole of England" to a 20-a-side game to be played under the Rugby rules. The notice itself was inconspicuous, being slotted in between other items.

The team representing England was captained by Frederick Stokes of Blackheath, that representing Scotland was led by Francis Moncrieff; the umpire was Hely Hutchinson Almond, headmaster of Loretto College. England played in all white, with a red rose on their shirts; Scotland wore brown shirts and white cricket flannels with a thistle.

The game was played at Raeburn Place, Edinburgh, the home ground of Edinburgh Academicals, on 27 March 1871. The game, played over two halves of 50 minutes between 20-a-side, was won by Scotland, who scored a goal (a try followed by a successful conversion kick). Both sides also scored a try, but these did not count as the conversion kicks were missed. Angus Buchanan scored the try (the first in international rugby), and William Cross converted it. A points scoring system had not then been devised.

In a return match at the Kennington Oval, London, in 1872, England were the winners.

This is not only the first international rugby match but the first international of any form of football because, despite the fact that three England v Scotland fixtures had already been played according to association football rules in 1870 and 1871, these are not considered full internationals by FIFA as the players competing in the Scotland team were London-based players who claimed a Scottish family connection rather than being truly Scottish players.

=== First Provincial match ===
The first provincial rugby football match in the world was played on 23 November 1872 in Scotland. This was between Glasgow District and Edinburgh District and played at the Burnbank ground in Woodlands, Glasgow. Edinburgh won the match 3–0 in a 20-a-side fixture.

This match became known as the 'Inter-City'. The Glasgow - Edinburgh match is still played today between the now professional provincial sides. Glasgow Warriors and Edinburgh Rugby compete for the 1872 Cup in recognition of the first Inter-City fixture.

=== Origins of the SRU ===
The "Scottish Football Union" (SFU) was founded in 1873.

=== The Calcutta Cup ===
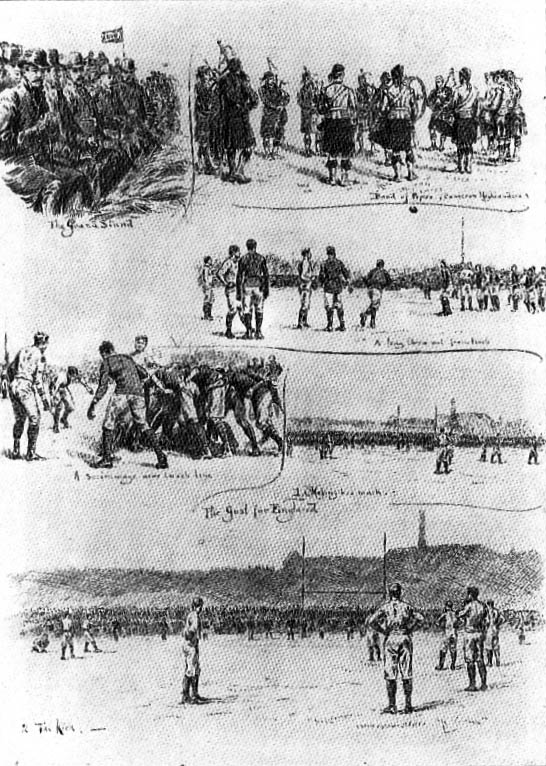
Calcutta Cup match, Raeburn Place, Edinburgh, 1890

The Calcutta Cup was gifted to the Rugby Football Union in 1878 by the members of the short-lived Calcutta Rugby Club. The members had decided to disband: the cup was crafted from melted-down silver rupees, which became available when the club's funds were withdrawn from the bank. The Cup is unique in that it is competed for annually only by England and Scotland. The first Calcutta Cup match was played in 1879, and, since that time, over 100 matches have taken place.

Scotland has won the Calcutta Cup 39 times. They compete in the Six Nations Championship and have never won it; however, they did win the last 5 Nations Championship in 1999, narrowly missing out on a grand slam. Scotland has participated in every Rugby World Cup tournament.

=== International Rugby Board ===
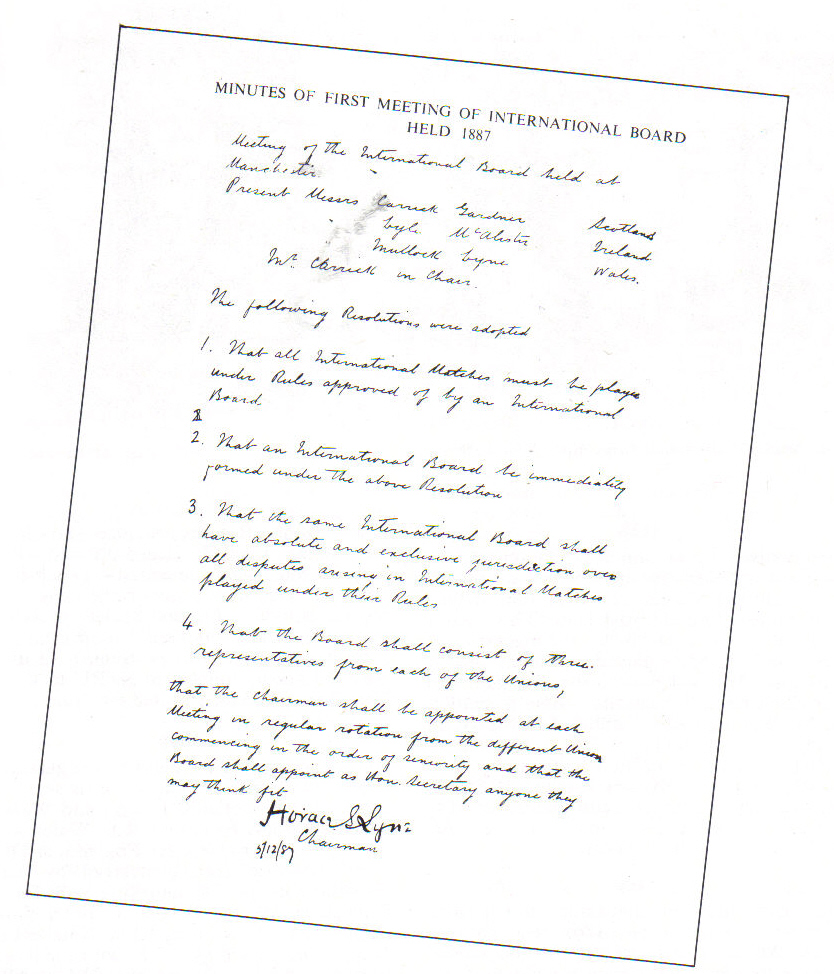

The SFU was a founder member of the International Rugby Board in 1886, along with Ireland and Wales.

Left: The minutes of the first formal meeting of the IRFB, from a meeting attended by Lyle and McAlistair of Ireland, Carrick and Gardner of Scotland, Mullock and Lyne of Wales.

England belatedly joined the Board in 1890. Australia, New Zealand, and South Africa became full members in 1949. France became a member in 1978, and a further eighty members joined from 1987 to 1999.

The International Rugby Board is now known as World Rugby and oversees the administration of the sport.

World Rugby organises the Rugby World Cups.

=== Late 19th and early 20th Centuries ===
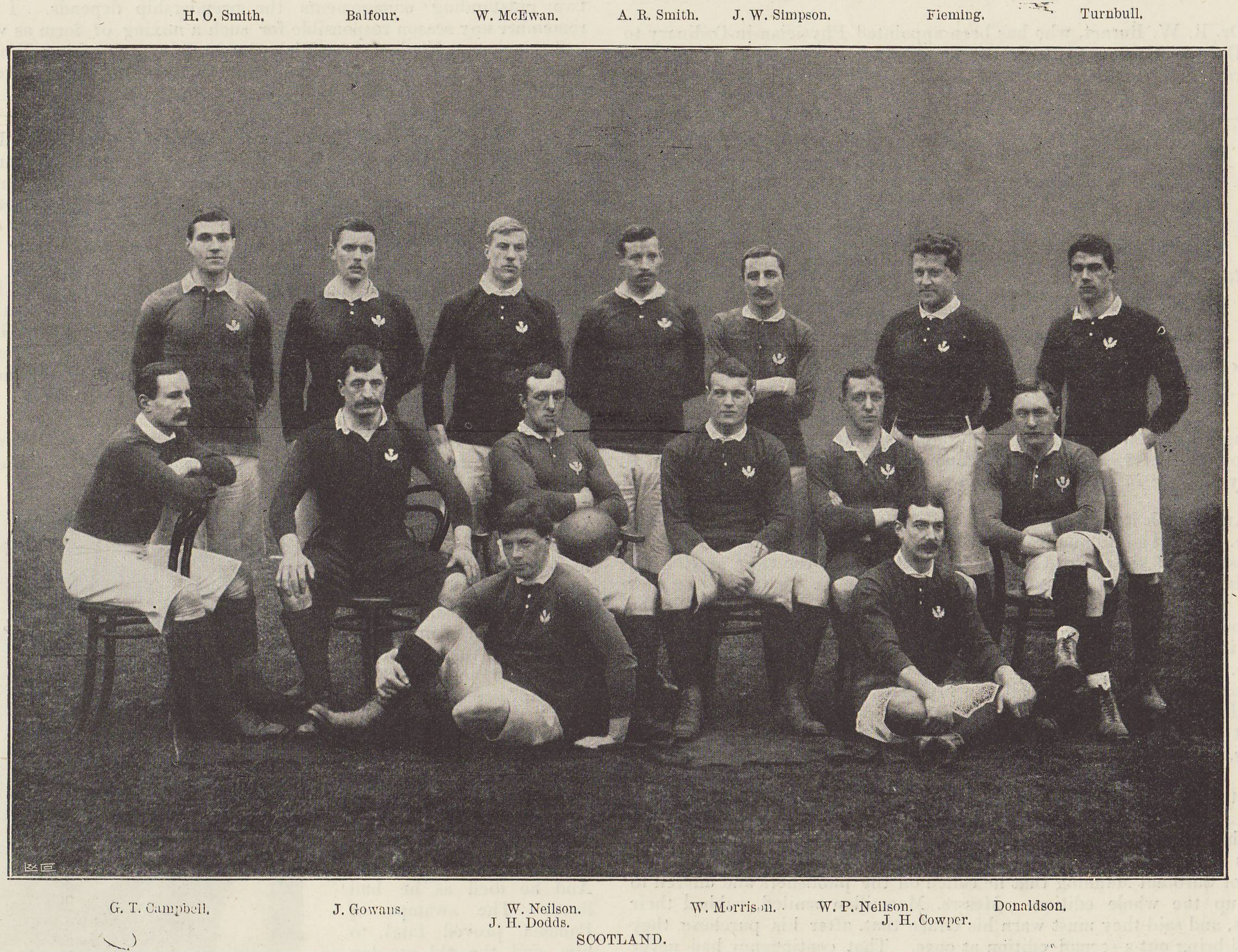
The Scotland team of 1896.

In 1897, land was purchased by the SFU at Inverleith, Edinburgh. Thus, the SFU became the first of the Home Unions to own its own ground. The first visitors were Ireland, on 18 February 1899 (Scotland 3 Ireland 9).

The Scots enjoyed periodic success in the early days, vying with Wales in the first decade of the 20th century. However, their Triple Crown win in 1907 would be the last for eighteen years as the First World War (1914–18) and England intervened to deny them glory.

In 1924, the SFU changed its name to become the Scottish Rugby Union.

International rugby was played at Inverleith until 1925. The SRU bought some land and built the first Murrayfield Stadium, which was opened on 21 March 1925.

== Invention of Rugby Sevens ==
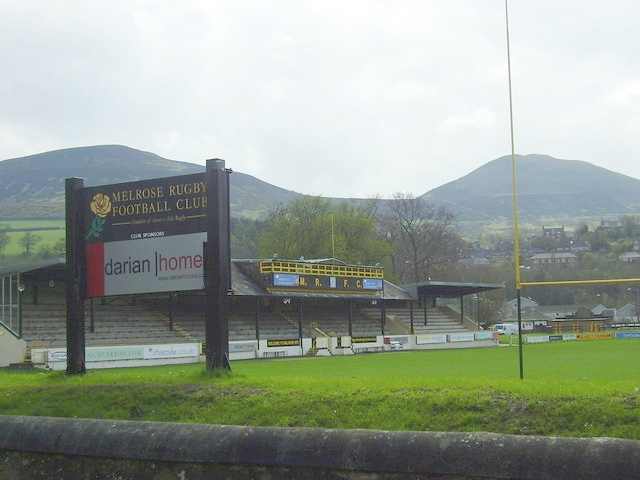
Nestling beneath the shadow of the Eildon Hills, the Greenyards at Melrose in Scotland is the original home of rugby sevens

Scotland has played a seminal role in the development of rugby, notably in Rugby sevens, which were initially conceived by Ned Haig, a butcher from Jedburgh, Scotland, as a fundraising event for his local club, Melrose, in 1883. The first ever officially sanctioned international tournament of rugby occurred at Murrayfield as part of the "Scottish Rugby Union's celebration of rugby" centenary celebrations in 1973. Due to the success of the format, the ongoing Hong Kong Sevens was launched three years later. In 1993, the Rugby World Cup Sevens was launched, and the trophy is known as the Melrose Cup in memory of Ned Haig's invention.

== Union-League schism ==
In 1895, there was a schism within the game of rugby in neighbouring England, which saw the sport divided into rugby union, which remained amateur and rugby league which permitted payments to players. However, no such split took place in Scotland, where the clubs continued to play rugby union. Fourteen Scottish players would cross over and play rugby league in England before amateurism was abandoned.

While rugby league is not as popular as rugby union in Scotland, it has maintained a continuous presence for over a century in the country, thanks partly to its proximity to Northern England, which is the heartland of the game.

== 1925-1945 ==
In 1925, Scotland already had victories over France at Inverleith (25-4), Wales in Swansea (24-14), and Ireland in Dublin (14-8). England, the Grand Slam champions of the two previous seasons, were the first visitors to Murrayfield. 70,000 spectators saw the lead change hands three times before Scotland secured a 14–11 victory, which gave them their first-ever Five Nations Grand Slam.

In 1926, Scotland became the first Home nation side to defeat England at Twickenham after England had won the Grand Slam five times in eight seasons.

The outbreak of the Second World War in September 1939 brought rugby union in Scotland to a halt. The SRU cancelled all arranged trials and international matches and encouraged the member clubs to carry on as best they could. Some clubs closed down, others amalgamated and carried on playing other local clubs and, sometimes, teams from the armed forces stationed in their various areas.

== 1946-1973 ==
Official internationals resumed in the 1946–7 season. In the Spring of 1946, Scotland played and defeated a strong New Zealand and Forces team.

The period after World War II was not a successful one for Scotland. In 1951, the touring Springboks massacred Scotland 44-0, scoring nine tries, a then record defeat. Scotland suffered 17 successive defeats between February 1951 and February 1955, scoring only 54 points in these 17 games: 11 tries, six conversions, and four penalties.

The teams from 1955 to 1963 were an improvement. There were no wins over England, but three of the games were drawn, and only twice was the margin of defeat more than a single point. 1964 was a good year for Scotland. New Zealand were held to a 0–0 draw, the last international match in which no points were scored. The Calcutta Cup was won 15–6, the first time since 1950, and they shared the Five Nations title in 1964 with Wales.

In 1971, the SRU appointed Bill Dickinson as their head coach, after years of avoidance, as it was their belief that rugby should remain an amateur sport. He was officially designated as an "adviser to the captain".

Scotland was the first of the Home Unions to run a truly nationwide club league. This was introduced in 1973 and still flourishes today with several of the country's original clubs still very much in evidence, such as Heriots, West of Scotland, Watsonians and the famous 'border' clubs such as Gala, Hawick, Jed-Forest, Kelso and Melrose. However, the advent of professionalism saw Scotland's District championship abandoned and two (later three) 'Super Districts' formed, which have resulted in the top players generally being unavailable for their clubs. These teams play in international club competitions such as the Heineken Cup and the Celtic League.

== 1974-2000 ==
Jim Telfer became the national coach in 1980.

Scotland toured Australia and won the first test, which to date is Scotland's only away victory against any of the big three Southern Hemisphere sides. After this, the 1983 season was a disappointment, with only one victory at Twickenham in the last match.

The 1983–84 season brought a draw with the All Blacks 25–25 in the late autumn and their second Grand Slam captained by Jim Aitken. Jim Telfer stood down after the Grand Slam to concentrate on his professional career as a school master. He was succeeded by his assistant, the former Hawick fly-half, Colin Telfer.

Scotland went to the first World Cup, played in New Zealand and Australia in the summer of 1987. Rutherford, the team's general and controlling influence, badly injured his knee on an unauthorised tour of Bermuda. He broke down after less than a quarter of an hour of the first World Cup match against France and never played for Scotland again. Scotland had been in the lead, but the match finished level, and Scotland had to face New Zealand in the quarter-final. They lost.

Their best year in the modern era, however, was 1990 when, captained by prop David Sole, their season came down to one game, a Grand Slam decider at Murrayfield against the "auld enemy" and hot favourites, England. Sole walked his men onto the field with quiet but steely determination, to the delight of the partisan home crowd. Scotland won 13–7, and with it their third Grand Slam.

The second World Cup took place in 1991 with matches shared between the Five Nations. Scotland won their pool, though the game against Ireland was close, and then beat Western Samoa in the quarter-final. They went out to England in the semi-final held at Murrayfield to a Rob Andrew drop goal. In the third-place play-off, they were again beaten by New Zealand.

The third World Cup, held in South Africa, came around in 1995. The tournament followed a familiar pattern: a narrow defeat by France, thanks to an injury-time try, meant that, as second in the pool, they faced a quarter-final against New Zealand and were eliminated.

== Professionalisation ==
The SRU redeveloped Murrayfield Stadium, which is the main home ground of the Scottish national team, starting in 1993.

Rugby union became professional in 1995. When the Heineken Cup was suggested, SRU officials were concerned that Scottish club sides could not compete against the best teams from France and England and that Scotland's District teams might do better if they became centrally funded.

The SRU professionalised the traditional Districts of Glasgow District, Edinburgh District, South and North and Midlands as the respective provincial clubs Glasgow Warriors, Edinburgh Rugby, Border Reivers and Caledonia Reds.

In 1996, these provincial professional clubs were given the go-ahead to take part in Europe. For the first two seasons, players were still released to play for their clubs in domestic competition, but eventually the districts became full-time operations.

Many of the traditional rugby union supporters in Scotland have viewed professionalism as contributing to a loss of a golden age, with some supporters mourning local and amateur players being replaced by hired professionals.

Then financial difficulties – the SRU's high debt, partly as a result of the redevelopment of Murrayfield and this initial lack of support from traditional club fans – called for retrenchment. After two seasons, the SRU 'merged' the four teams into two. This resulted in short-lived name changes: Edinburgh merged with the Border Reivers to form a team to be known as Edinburgh Reivers, and Glasgow merged with Caledonia Reds to form a team to be known as Glasgow Caledonians. In effect, though, the Caledonia Reds and Border Reivers sides were selected by the SRU to be disbanded in 1998, and this despite the Reds winning the 1996–97 Scottish Inter-District Championship and the Border Reivers district being the traditional heartlands of Scottish rugby.

With the establishment of the Celtic League tournament, the SRU felt confident enough to resurrect one of the disbanded districts. It chose the Border Reivers in 2002, and they joined the second season of the Celtic League. The merged names of Edinburgh and Glasgow were then ditched, although Edinburgh briefly flirted with a 'Gunners' epitaph in 2006, and Glasgow formally adopted its warrior logo as an epitaph in 2005.

In 2004, international rugby games were played at Hampden Park in Glasgow and McDiarmid Park in Perth, as part of the SRU's campaign to reach out to new audiences outside the traditional rugby areas.

Unfortunately, the Border side was still unsustainable, and it folded again in 2007. Establishing four professional districts once again remains a long-term goal of the SRU, and the now likelier candidate Caledonia Reds will be re-established when the SRU believes financial circumstances permit.

=== Changes in the professional era ===
In 1996, the 4 newly professional Districts continued as before, playing in the Scottish Inter-District Championship which became a European Qualifying Tournament. The top sides were entered into the Heineken Cup, the bottom side was entered in the European Challenge Cup. This meant that the Scottish Exiles side was excluded from the professional Inter-District Championship as it could not represent Scotland in European competition.

In 1998, when the Caledonia Reds and Border Reivers folded, the SRU realised that Glasgow and Edinburgh needed more competition to become competitive. Overtures were made to the Welsh Rugby Union, and a Welsh-Scottish League began in 1999.

The success of the joint venture between the SRU and the WRU eventually brought the Irish Rugby Football Union on board, and a Celtic League was set up in 2001 with Scottish, Irish, and Welsh sides. It ran in parallel with the Welsh-Scottish League for its first season, but fixture congestion prompted the ending of the Welsh-Scottish competition in favour of the expanded tournament.

A brief cup competition, the Celtic Cup was also tried, but again this ended due to fixture congestion.

The Celtic League was further extended with the introduction of Italian professional sides. This resulted in another name change, and the professional league became known as the Pro12. After two South African teams joined in 2017, the competition was renamed the Pro14.

Glasgow Warriors became the first Scottish side to win a professional trophy in season 2014–15.

== Into the 2000s ==
=== The new millennium ===
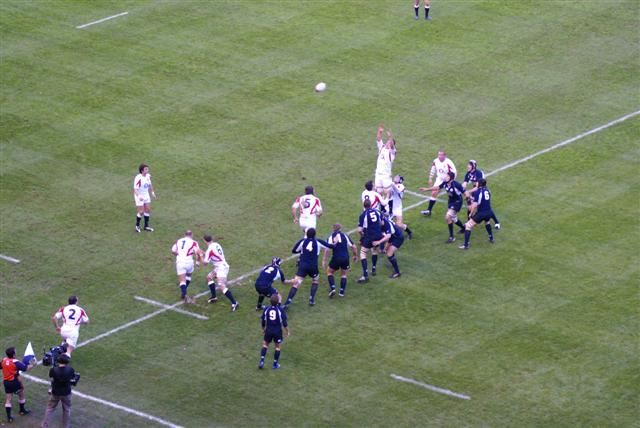
Lineout in England-Scotland game, 2007

Scotland also won the last-ever Five Nations Championship in 1999 with some dashing displays of 15-man rugby and to a last-minute win by Wales over England, but that year's World Cup ended the usual way, with a quarter-final defeat by New Zealand.

They endured a torrid Six Nations in 2000, losing their first four straight games, including a humiliating 34–20 defeat to a debuting Italy. In their last game, they managed a 19–13 win under captain Andy Nicol over an unbeaten England at a rain-soaked Murrayfield

=== 2003 season & the future ===
After a poor start in the Six Nations in 2004 in which Scotland did not win a single match and claimed the wooden spoon, things were believed to be steadily improving once again under the Australian coach Matt Williams, the first foreigner to coach the national team.

Despite setbacks, many new and talented young players are coming through to the top level. Yet the record for 2004 was disappointing: Played 12, won 2, lost 10. Williams also attempted to introduce a controversial "Fortress Scotland" policy, whereby only those currently playing in Scotland were eligible to play in the national team. Meanwhile, the Scottish Rugby Union (SRU) is under new management, Chief Executive Phil Anderton (known as 'Firework Phil' for his pre-match entertainment spectacles) was leading the way back to financial solvency and implementing major reforms to reverse the decline of the game in Scotland, but he resigned in January 2005 after his boss David Mackay was forced to resign by the SRU's general committee. Since then, much effort and thought have gone into restructuring the way the game is governed in Scotland.

==== Under Frank Hadden ====
Frank Hadden, the head coach of Edinburgh Gunners (previously a PE teacher at Merchiston Castle School in Edinburgh), was appointed interim coach for the 2005 summer internationals against the Barbarians and Romania, winning two from two and instilling confidence in the national side again. On 15 September 2005, he was appointed national coach of the Scotland team up to and including the 2007 World Cup.

In the first match of the 2006 Six Nations campaign, against France, Scotland won 20–16, and this was the first time since 1999 that they had beaten France. Scotland also beat England 18–12 at home at Murrayfield on 25 February 2006 to reclaim the Calcutta Cup.

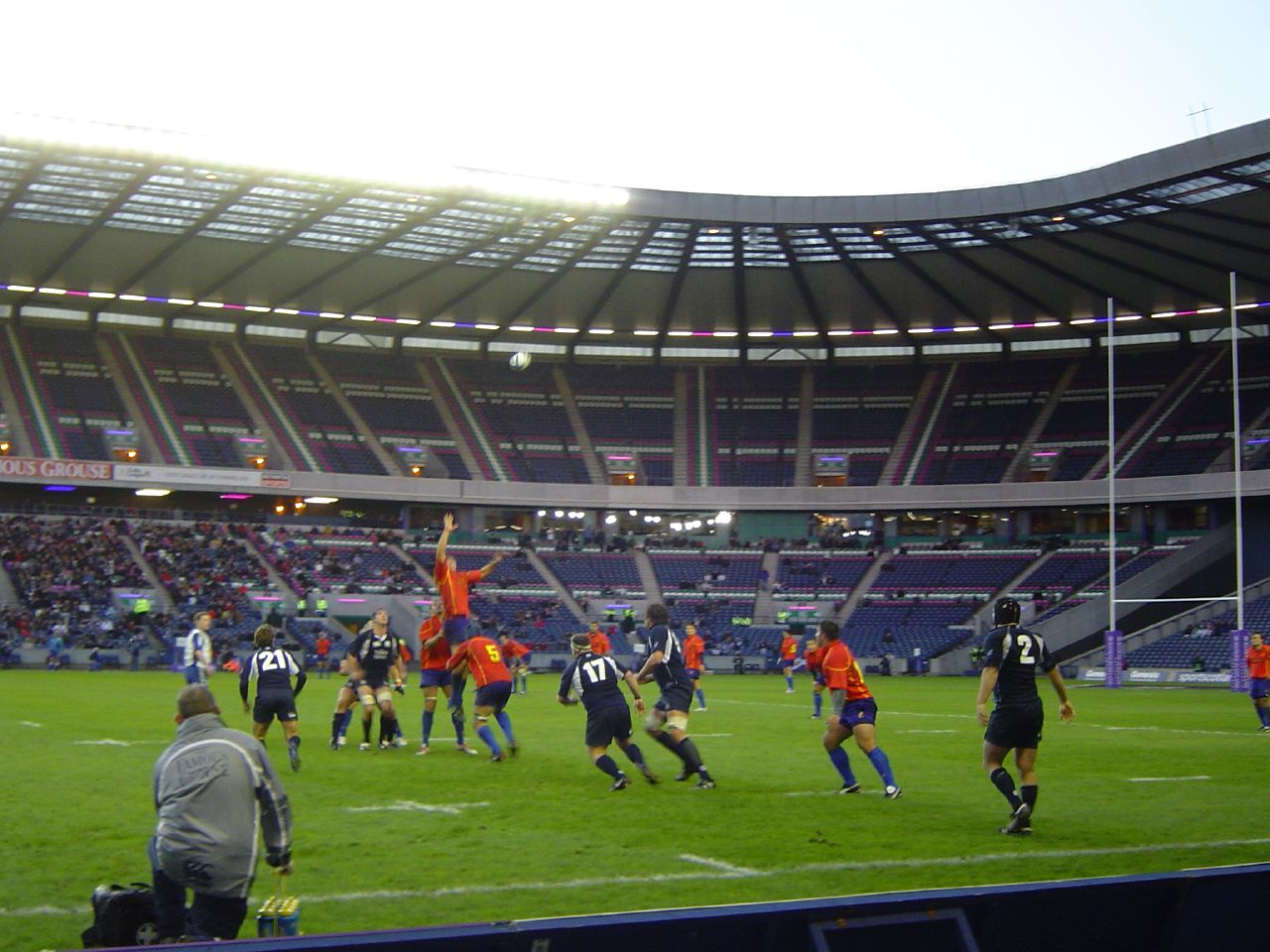
11 November 2006 Scotland 44-6 Romania

In the 2006 Autumn internationals, Scotland won two of three fixtures. They convincingly beat Romania and put up a solid first-half performance against the Pacific Islanders. In the final match against Australia, Scotland failed to impress. A sound first-half performance was squandered with an uncharacteristically poor defence in the second. Australia went on to win the game 44–15. The series provided a mixture of advances and setbacks. Scotland lost several key players through injury, notably captain Jason White, who suffered a knee injury and missed the entire 2007 Six Nations Championship.

Scotland suffered a humiliating defeat on 24 February 2007 when they became the first Six Nations team to lose at home to Italy, 17–37. This was Italy's biggest ever victory over Scotland, home or away. After only six minutes of the match, Scotland were already trailing 0-21, due to a clearance kick being charged down and two interceptions by the Italians. Man of the match was awarded to Italian Alessandro Troncon, who scored a late try to put the match out of reach.

In 2007, The Borders was disbanded yet again due to continuing financial difficulties. Also in the same year, the SRU began organising the Edinburgh 7s, the final event in the annual IRB Sevens World Series.

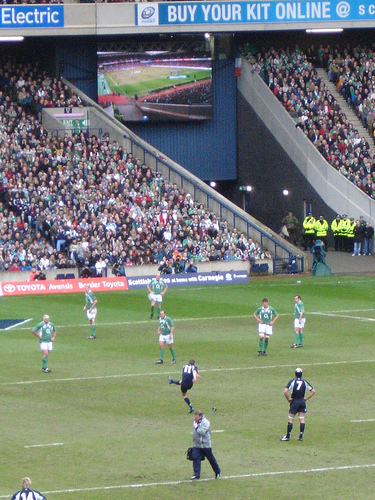
Scotland v Ireland 2007

Later that year, the side travelled to France for the Rugby World Cup. They fought their way through a difficult group and made it to the quarter-finals, where they were knocked out by Argentina.

Despite the promising World Cup, Scotland did not emerge in the Six Nations as the dark horses the media had predicted. Scotland opened their campaign at home but lost 27–6 to France. Pressure on Frank Hadden started to intensify after round 2 as Scotland lost 30–15 to a rejuvenated Wales side, who could have scored more. Scotland finally managed to score a try against Ireland, despite losing. They didn't need to score a try against England, however, as they regained the Calcutta Cup with a 15–9 victory in a dull contest. Scotland scored two tries against Italy but lost thanks to a drop goal in the last minute to go down 23–20. Scotland managed to avoid the wooden spoon on scoring difference, but it was a disappointing campaign. They then toured Argentina to play two tests against Argentina. They lost the first test 21-15 and won the second 26–14.

== Scottish Sports Hall of Fame ==
The following rugby players have been inducted into the Scottish Sports Hall of Fame:

- Finlay Calder
- Douglas Elliot
- Gavin Hastings
- Andy Irvine
- George MacPherson
- Mark Coxon Morrison
- David Sole
- Robert Wilson Shaw

Also, Leslie Balfour-Melville (1854–1937), as an all-rounder, since he played many other sports.

== See also ==
- History of rugby union matches between New Zealand and Scotland
- History of rugby union matches between Scotland and South Africa
