= History of rugby union matches between Australia and Scotland =

The national rugby union teams of Australia and Scotland have been playing each other in test rugby since 1927, and by November 2026, they have met in thirty six test matches. Their first meeting was on 17 December 1927, and was won 10–8 by Scotland. Their most recent meeting took place at Murrayfield Stadium in November 2026, and was won 15-12 by Scotland. Scotland won seven of the first nine matches between the sides but then had to wait twenty-seven years until November 2009 for their next victory, as the next sixteen games were all won by Australia. Since 1998, the two teams have competed for the Hopetoun Cup.

== Summary ==
=== Overall ===
Details	Played	Won by Australia	Won by Scotland	Drawn	Australia points	Scotland points
In Australia	12	9	3	0	332	140
In Scotland	23	12	11	0	459	351
Neutral venue	1	1	0	0	35	34
Overall	36	22	14	0	826	535

=== Records ===
Note: Date shown in brackets indicates when the record was or last set.

Record	Australia	Scotland
Longest winning streak	16 (10 Jul 1982 – 21 Nov 2009)	3 (17 Jun 2017 – 6 Nov 2021)
Largest points for
Home	45 (13 June 1998)	53 (25 November 2017)
Away	44 (25 November 2006)	34 (18 October 2015)
Largest winning margin
Home	42 (13 June 1998)	29 (25 November 2017)
Away	29 (25 November 2006)	5 (4 July 1982)

== Results ==
No.	Date	Venue	Score	Winner	Competition
1	17 December 1927	Murrayfield Stadium, Edinburgh	10–8	Scotland	1927–28 New South Wales tour of Great Britain, Ireland and France
2	22 November 1947	Murrayfield Stadium, Edinburgh	7–16	Australia	1947–48 Australia tour of Great Britain, Ireland, France and North America
3	15 February 1958	Murrayfield Stadium, Edinburgh	12–8	Scotland	1957–58 Australia tour of Great Britain, Ireland and France
4	17 December 1966	Murrayfield Stadium, Edinburgh	11–5	Scotland	1966–67 Australia tour of Great Britain, Ireland and France
5	6 November 1968	Murrayfield Stadium, Edinburgh	9–3	Scotland	1968 Australia tour of Great Britain and Ireland
6	6 June 1970	Sydney Cricket Ground, Sydney	23–3	Australia	1970 Scotland tour of Australia
7	6 December 1975	Murrayfield Stadium, Edinburgh	10–3	Scotland	1975–76 Australia tour of Great Britain, Ireland and North America
8	19 December 1981	Murrayfield Stadium, Edinburgh	24–15	Scotland	1981–82 Australia tour of Great Britain and Ireland
9	4 July 1982	Ballymore Stadium, Brisbane	7–12	Scotland	1982 Scotland tour of Australia
10	10 July 1982	Sydney Cricket Ground, Sydney	33–9	Australia	1982 Scotland tour of Australia
11	8 December 1984	Murrayfield Stadium, Edinburgh	12–37	Australia	1984 Australia tour of Great Britain and Ireland
12	19 November 1988	Murrayfield Stadium, Edinburgh	13–32	Australia	1988 Australia tour of Great Britain and Italy
13	13 June 1992	Sydney Football Stadium, Sydney	27–12	Australia	1992 Scotland tour of Australia
14	21 June 1992	Ballymore Stadium, Brisbane	37–13	Australia	1992 Scotland tour of Australia
15	9 November 1996	Murrayfield Stadium, Edinburgh	19–29	Australia	1996 Australia tour of Great Britain, Ireland and Italy
16	22 November 1997	Murrayfield Stadium, Edinburgh	8–37	Australia	1997 Australia tour of Argentina and Great Britain
17	13 June 1998	Sydney Football Stadium, Sydney	45–3	Australia	1998 Scotland tour of Australia and Fiji
18	20 June 1998	Lang Park, Brisbane	33–11	Australia	1998 Scotland tour of Australia and Fiji
19	11 November 2000	Murrayfield Stadium, Edinburgh	9–30	Australia	2000 Autumn International
20	8 November 2003	Lang Park, Brisbane	33–16	Australia	2003 Rugby World Cup
21	13 June 2004	Docklands Stadium, Melbourne	35–15	Australia	2004 Scotland tour of Oceania
22	19 June 2004	Stadium Australia, Sydney	34–13	Australia	2004 Scotland tour of Oceania
23	6 November 2004	Murrayfield Stadium, Edinburgh	14–31	Australia	2004 Australia tour of Scotland
24	20 November 2004	Hampden Park, Glasgow	17–31	Australia	2004 Australia tour of Scotland
25	25 November 2006	Murrayfield Stadium, Edinburgh	15–44	Australia	2006 Autumn International
26	21 November 2009	Murrayfield Stadium, Edinburgh	9–8	Scotland	2009 Autumn International
27	5 June 2012	McDonald Jones Stadium, Newcastle	6–9	Scotland	2012 Scotland tour of Oceania
28	23 November 2013	Murrayfield Stadium, Edinburgh	15–21	Australia	2013 Autumn International
29	18 October 2015	Twickenham Stadium, London (England)	35–34	Australia	2015 Rugby World Cup
30	12 November 2016	Murrayfield Stadium, Edinburgh	22–23	Australia	2016 Autumn International
31	17 June 2017	Sydney Football Stadium, Sydney	19–24	Scotland	2017 Summer International
32	25 November 2017	Murrayfield Stadium, Edinburgh	53–24	Scotland	2017 Autumn International
33	6 November 2021	Murrayfield Stadium, Edinburgh	15–13	Scotland	2021 Autumn International
34	29 October 2022	Murrayfield Stadium, Edinburgh	15–16	Australia	2022 Autumn international
35	24 November 2024	Murrayfield Stadium, Edinburgh	27–13	Scotland	2024 Autumn International
36	15 November 2026	Murrayfield Stadium, Edinburgh	15–12	Scotland	2026 Nations Championship

== List of series ==
Played	Won by Australia	Won by Scotland	Drawn
5	4	0	1

Year	Australia	Scotland	Series winner	Hopetoun Cup
1982	1	1	draw	Not awarded
1992	2	0	Australia	Not awarded
1998	2	0	Australia	
2004	2	0	Australia	
2004	2	0	Australia	
