= 1992 Scotland rugby union tour of Australia =

Summary
P	W	D	L
Total
8	3	2	3
Test match
2	0	0	2
Opponent
P	W	D	L
Australia
2	0	0	2

The 1992 Scotland rugby union tour of Australia was a series of matches played in May and June 1992 in Australia by Scotland national rugby union team.

== Results ==
Scores and results list Scotland's points tally first.

Opponent	For	Against	Date	Venue	Status
Northern Territory Invitation XV	16	17	28 May 1992	Rugby Park, Darwin	Tour match
Queensland	15	15	31 May 1992	Ballymore, Brisbane	Tour match
Emerging Wallabies	24	24	3 June 1992	Bellerive Oval Hobart	Tour match
New South Wales	35	15	6 June 1992	Waratah Rugby Stadium, Sydney	Tour match
New South Wales Country	26	10	9 June 1992	Scully Park, Tamworth	Tour match
Australia	12	27	13 June 1992	Football Stadium, Sydney	Test match
Queensland Country	29	12	17 June 1992	Gold Park, Toowoomba	Tour match
Australia	13	37	21 June 1992	Ballymore, Brisbane	Test match

== Touring party ==
- Manager: C. Ritchie
- Coach: J. R. Dixon
- Assistant coach: David Johnston
- Captain: David Sole

=== Backs ===
- D. C. Bain
- Craig Chalmers
- Peter Dods
- Gavin Hastings
- Scott Hastings
- Sean Lineen
- Kenny Logan
- D. B. Millard
- Andy Nicol
- Graham Shiel
- Tony Stanger
- Derek Stark
- Gregor Townsend
- Iwan Tukalo

=== Forwards ===
- Ian Corcoran
- Damian Cronin
- Chris Gray
- Kenny Milne
- David Sole
- Rob Wainwright
- Peter Wright
