= History of rugby union matches between New Zealand and Scotland =

The All Blacks first played against Scotland in 1905 at Inverleith field in Edinburgh, during the historic 1905–1906 All Blacks tour of Europe and North America. The two teams have played 34 times, with New Zealand winning 32 matches and 2 drawn matches. Scotland have yet to register a victory in 121 years of fixtures between the two teams. The most recent test was played at Murrayfield on 7 November 2026 with New Zealand winning 43–21.

== Summary ==
=== Overall ===
Details	Played	Won by New Zealand	Won by Scotland	Drawn	New Zealand points	Scotland points
In New Zealand	10	10	0	0	372	133
In Scotland	22	20	0	2	588	241
Neutral venue	2	2	0	0	61	36
Overall	34	32	0	2	1,021	410

=== Records ===
Note: Date shown in brackets indicates when the record was or last set.

Record	New Zealand	Scotland
Longest winning streak	22 (6 Jun 1987 – Present)	—N/a
Largest points for
Home	69 (24 Jun 2000)	25 (12 Nov 1983)
Away	51 (11 Nov 2012)	31 (15 Jun 1996)
Largest winning margin
Home	49 (24 Jun 2000)	—N/a
Away	46 (13 Nov 2010)	—N/a

== Results ==
No.	Date	Venue	Score	Winner	Competition
1	18 November 1905	Inverleith, Edinburgh	7–12	New Zealand	1905-06 New Zealand tour
2	23 November 1935	Murrayfield, Edinburgh	8–18	New Zealand	1935-36 New Zealand tour
3	13 February 1954	Murrayfield, Edinburgh	0–3	New Zealand	1953-54 New Zealand tour
4	18 January 1964	Murrayfield, Edinburgh	0–0	draw	1963-64 New Zealand tour
5	2 December 1967	Murrayfield, Edinburgh	3–14	New Zealand	1967 New Zealand tour
6	16 December 1972	Murrayfield, Edinburgh	9–14	New Zealand	1972-73 New Zealand tour
7	14 June 1975	Eden Park, Auckland	24–0	New Zealand	1975 Scotland rugby union tour of New Zealand
8	9 December 1978	Murrayfield, Edinburgh	9–18	New Zealand	1978 New Zealand tour
9	10 November 1979	Murrayfield, Edinburgh	6–20	New Zealand	1979 New Zealand tour
10	13 June 1981	Carisbrook, Dunedin	11–4	New Zealand	1981 Scotland rugby union tour of New Zealand
11	20 June 1981	Eden Park, Auckland	40–15	New Zealand	1981 Scotland rugby union tour of New Zealand
12	12 November 1983	Murrayfield, Edinburgh	25–25	draw	1983 New Zealand tour
13	6 June 1987	Lancaster Park, Christchurch	30–3	New Zealand	1987 Rugby World Cup Quarter Final
14	16 June 1990	Carisbrook, Dunedin	31–16	New Zealand	1990 Scotland rugby union tour of New Zealand
15	23 June 1990	Eden Park, Auckland	21–18	New Zealand	1990 Scotland rugby union tour of New Zealand
16	30 October 1991	National Stadium, Cardiff	13–6	New Zealand	1991 Rugby World Cup Third Place Match
17	20 November 1993	Murrayfield, Edinburgh	15–51	New Zealand	1993 New Zealand tour of Britain
18	11 June 1995	Loftus Versfeld, Pretoria, South Africa	48–30	New Zealand	1995 Rugby World Cup Quarter Final
19	15 June 1996	Carisbrook, Dunedin	62–31	New Zealand	1996 Scotland rugby union tour of New Zealand
20	22 June 1996	Eden Park, Auckland	36–12	New Zealand	1996 Scotland rugby union tour of New Zealand
21	24 October 1999	Murrayfield, Edinburgh	18–30	New Zealand	1999 Rugby World Cup Quarter Final
22	24 June 2000	Carisbrook, Dunedin	69–20	New Zealand	2000 Scotland rugby union tour of New Zealand
23	1 July 2000	Eden Park, Auckland	48–14	New Zealand	2000 Scotland rugby union tour of New Zealand
24	24 November 2001	Murrayfield, Edinburgh	6–37	New Zealand	2001 New Zealand rugby union tour
25	26 November 2005	Murrayfield, Edinburgh	10–29	New Zealand	2005 end of year rugby union tests
26	23 September 2007	Murrayfield, Edinburgh	0–40	New Zealand	2007 Rugby World Cup Pool Match
27	8 November 2008	Murrayfield, Edinburgh	6–32	New Zealand	2008 Autumn International
28	13 November 2010	Murrayfield, Edinburgh	3–49	New Zealand	2010 Autumn International
29	11 November 2012	Murrayfield, Edinburgh	22–51	New Zealand	2012 Autumn International
30	15 November 2014	Murrayfield, Edinburgh	16–24	New Zealand	2014 Autumn International
31	18 November 2017	Murrayfield, Edinburgh	17–22	New Zealand	2017 Autumn International
32	13 November 2022	Murrayfield, Edinburgh	23–31	New Zealand	2022 Autumn International
33	8 November 2025	Murrayfield, Edinburgh	17–25	New Zealand	2025 Autumn International
34	7 November 2026	Murrayfield, Edinburgh	21-43	New Zealand	2026 Nations Championship

== List of series ==
Played	Won by New Zealand	Won by Scotland	Drawn
4	4	0	0

Year	New Zealand	Scotland	Series winner
(New Zealand) 1981	2	0	New Zealand
(New Zealand) 1990	2	0	New Zealand
(New Zealand) 1996	2	0	New Zealand
(New Zealand) 2000	2	0	New Zealand
