= Greig Oliver =

Scotland rugby union player (1964–2023)

- Born: Greig Hunter Oliver; 12 September 1964 Hawick, Scotland
- Died: 3 July 2023 (aged 58) Sea Point, South Africa

Rugby union career
- Position: Scrum-half
International career
Years	Team	Apps	(Points)
1987–1991	Scotland	3	(4)
Coaching career
- Years: Team
- 2011–2023: Munster (academy)

Greig Hunter Oliver (12 September 1964 – 3 July 2023) was a Scottish rugby union player turned development officer.

== Early life ==
Oliver was born in Hawick, Scotland, and educated at Hawick High School and Napier College in Edinburgh. He worked as a sports sub-editor at the Southern Reporter.

== Playing career ==
Oliver, then aged 18, made his first appearance for Hawick RFC in October 1982. He won honours for South of Scotland at junior, under-21 and senior levels, and earned his first senior international cap for Scotland at the inaugural 1987 Rugby World Cup as a replacement for Gary Armstrong in their 60–21 win against Zimbabwe, with Oliver scoring one try and becoming Hawick's 50th international player during the match.

The following year, Oliver was part of the uncapped Scotland tour of Zimbabwe, scoring a hat-trick in the 31–10 win against Zimbabwe. Oliver toured Japan in 1989, New Zealand in 1990 and North America in 1991, featuring in 15 out of Scotland's 24 matches during these tours, as well as being an unused replacement during Scotland's 1990 grand slam campaign.

Oliver's second international cap for Scotland during a 21–18 loss to New Zealand during the 1990 tour, and his third and final international cap was against Zimbabwe at the 1991 Rugby World Cup.

== Coaching ==
After retiring from playing rugby, Oliver joined Scottish Rugby's team of development officers and, in June 1994, become an academy manager, a role he would hold for the next thirteen years. In addition to his role as academy manager, Oliver was also an assistant coach with the Scotland under-21 team and head coach of the Scotland under-20 team. Outside of his professional commitments, Oliver was also involved in the domestic game, where he was head coach of his hometown club Hawick RFC, coaching them to back-to-back Scottish Premiership titles in the 2000–01 and 2001–02 seasons.

In 2007, Oliver moved to Limerick, Ireland, where his wife was from. He joined the staff at local club Garryowen, first as technical director and then as director of rugby until, in 2011, he joined Munster, working with the club's academy as an elite player development officer. In addition to his role with Munster, Oliver also held coaching roles with Munster's A team, the Ireland under-20 team, Munster's various age-grade teams and Cashel RFC.

== Personal life and death ==
Oliver and his wife, Fiona, had two children: son Jack who, like his father, is a scrum-half and joined Munster's academy in 2022, and daughter Ciara, who excelled at both gaelic football and camogie, being selected for the Limerick Ladies Minor in 2021 and representing Ahane camogie club.

Oliver died in a paragliding accident on 3 July 2023 in Sea Point, South Africa. He had been on a tandem ride with a pilot, but collided with two paragliders near the landing site and crashed into rocks. National Sea Rescue Institute rescue swimmers and paramedics freed Oliver from the rocks and attempted CPR at the scene, but their efforts were not successful. Oliver had been in South Africa to follow the Ireland under-20 team, for who his son Jack was playing, at the 2023 World Rugby U20 Championship; Ireland defeated Fiji the day after Oliver's death to progress to the tournament's semi-finals.
