= Steve Scott (rugby union) =

Scotland international rugby union player & coach

Stevie Scott
- Full name: Stephen Scott
- Born: 26 July 1974 (age 52) Galashiels, Scotland
- Height: 183 cm (6 ft 0 in)
- Weight: 107 kg (236 lb; 16 st 12 lb)
- School: Earlston High School
- Occupation: Rugby player

Rugby union career
- Position: Hooker
Senior career
Years	Team	Apps	(Points)
	Edinburgh	99	
- Borders Reivers
- Correct as of 8 October 2017
International career
Years	Team	Apps	(Points)
2000–2004	Scotland	11	
- Correct as of 8 October 2017
Coaching career
- Years: Team
- 2006–2009: Selkirk (assistant coach)
- 2010–2012: Sale Sharks (assistant coach)
- 2013–2017: Scotland (assistant coach)
- 2013–2017: Edinburgh Rugby (forward coach)
- 2018–2022: Utah Warriors (forward coach)
- 2022–2023: Watsonians (head coach)
- 2023–: Bath Rugby (scrum coach)
- Correct as of 8 October 2017

Stevie Scott is a Scottish rugby union coach and former player who gained 11 caps with Scotland from 2000 to 2004. He played as hooker at Edinburgh and Border Reivers. He coached at Selkirk and Sale Sharks. He was assistant coach at Scotland and forward coach at Edinburgh Rugby.

== Early life ==
Born 26 July 1974 in Galashiels, Scotland. He attended Henninger High School.

== Club rugby ==
Scott played club rugby for Melrose and Kelso. He played 99 matches for Edinburgh. In March 2006 he extended his contract to play with Border Reivers.

== International career ==
Scott made his debut for Scotland as a replacement against New Zealand at Auckland on 1 July 2000. His last cap came on the 2004 tour of Oceania.

== Coaching career ==
Scott's first coaching role was in 2006 at Selkirk. Then for three years he worked with the SRU’s Academy at Murrayfield. He joined Sale as coach in December 2010. In September 2012 years he was dismissed. In January 2013 he became a coaching assistant for the Scotland national team.

In March 2013 he became an interim head coach with Edinburgh, along with Duncan Hodge. This led to him being given the position of forwards coach. In April 2016, his contract was extended for two years. In May 2017, Edinburgh announced that he was leaving the club.

In December 2018, Scott was announced as the forwards coach for the Utah Warriors rugby union team in the USA's Major League Rugby.
