= Craig Smith (rugby union) =

Scotland international rugby union player

- Born: Craig James Smith; 30 August 1978 (age 48) Fulford, York, England
- Height: 1.89 m (6 ft 2 in)
- Weight: 122 kg (19 st 3 lb)
- School: Berwick County High School

Rugby union career
- Position: Prop
Amateur team(s)
Years	Team	Apps	(Points)
- Berwick
Senior career
Years	Team	Apps	(Points)
- Melrose
- Nelson Bays
2000–2008	Edinburgh		
2008–2010	Racing-Métro	26	(0)
2010–2011	Dax	27	(5)
2011–2013	Narbonne	38	(15)
2013–	Hagetmau		
International career
Years	Team	Apps	(Points)
2002–08	Scotland	25	(0)
- Correct as of 15 March 2008

Craig James Smith (born 30 August 1978) was a Scottish professional rugby union player, currently in the French second-level Rugby Pro D2. club Narbonne. Previously, he had spent nine seasons in Scotland with Edinburgh Rugby and also played for Racing Métro.

== Career ==
Craig started playing at Berwick RFC before a stint at Melrose RFC. The former pupil of Berwick County High School played for Scottish Students, Scotland Development XV and the Scottish Co-optimists.

He won his first Scotland A cap during the 2000–01 season against Italy and played 10 times at that level. He also played for the Stoke RUFC in New Zealand's South Island and was selected for Nelson Bays against Scotland during the Summer 2000 Scotland tour of NZ. On his return to Scotland later that year he was contracted by Edinburgh Rugby. Craig has represented Scotland at all age-grade levels and was in the Scotland U19 squad who beat England in 1997.

Smith played in both Test matches on Scotland's 2002 tour of North America. Before the tour he had played at loose-head prop in the non-cap match against the Barbarians, but he lined up at tight-head when he started matches on the tour. He first appeared for the Scottish national side as a substitute in the non-cap game against the Barbarians in May 2001.

He went on to play in all three test matches on Scotland's 2004 Summer tour to Australia, all three Autumn Internationals in 2005, and came on as a replacement in every Scotland game in the 2006 Six Nations Championship.
