= Eric Milroy =

Scotland international rugby union player (1887–1916)

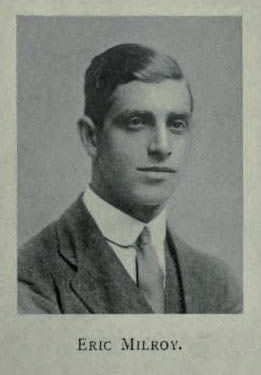
- Born: Eric MacLeod Milroy; 4 December 1887 Edinburgh, Scotland
- Died: 18 July 1916 (aged 28) (missing in action) Delville Wood, France
- School: George Watson's College
- University: Edinburgh University
- Occupation: Chartered accountant

Rugby union career
- Position: Scrum-half
Amateur team(s)
Years	Team	Apps	(Points)
1906–1914	Watsonians		
Provincial / State sides
Years	Team	Apps	(Points)
1909	Edinburgh District		
1911	Blues Trial		
International career
Years	Team	Apps	(Points)
1910–1914	Scotland	12	(3)
- Military career
- Allegiance: United Kingdom
- Branch: British Army
- Service years: 1914–1916
- Rank: Lieutenant
- Unit: Black Watch
- Conflicts: World War I: Battle of the Somme; Battle of Delville Wood †

Eric "Puss" MacLeod Milroy (4 December 1887 – 18 July 1916) was a rugby union player who represented Scotland and Watsonians. He was capped twelve times for Scotland between 1910 and 1914, his first appearance coming as a surprise replacement for the Scottish captain, George Cunningham. He was selected for the 1910 British Isles tour to South Africa after other players were forced to withdraw. Due to illness, he only participated in three matches, and did not take part in any of the tests against South Africa. In 1914, he captained Scotland against Ireland, and against England in the last international match before the outbreak of the First World War.

At the start of the war, Milroy was commissioned in the Black Watch and was killed in action in Delville Wood, France, during the Battle of the Somme. He was one of 31 Scottish rugby internationals to be killed in action. Milroy is commemorated on the Thiepval Memorial to the missing dead of the Somme.

== Early life ==
Eric Milroy was born in Edinburgh on 4 December 1887, the second son of Alexander MacLeod Milroy, a bank agent, and Margaret Walteria Milroy. His siblings were Jessie, Rowatt, and Margaret. He went to school at George Watson's College from 1895 to 1906. As well as playing scrum-half for the first XV in his final year, he was a scholar and a skilled debater in the Literary Society. Winning a bursary to Edinburgh University in 1906, he studied mathematics, graduating with a Master of Arts with honours in 1910. Thereafter he took up an apprenticeship with the firm of Messrs A & J Robertson, chartered accountants, and himself became a chartered accountant in 1914.

== Rugby Union career ==
=== Amateur career ===
While at Edinburgh University, Milroy played for his school's old boys club, Watsonians, and remained with the team after graduating, until 1914. Between 1908 and 1914, Watsonians won the Scottish Club Championship five times, being undefeated in the season of 1909 to 1910. That success was attributed in part to Milroy's 'wonderful success at the base of the scrum'.

=== Provincial career ===
He represented Edinburgh District in 1909.

He played for the Blues Trial side against the Whites Trial side on 21 January 1911 while still with Watsonians.

=== International career ===
Milroy won twelve caps for Scotland. The first of them was against Wales on 5 February 1910 at Cardiff. His selection was surprising, as he replaced George Cunningham, who had captained Scotland to victory against France in the preceding game. Yet, there was a sentiment in the South Wales Daily Post that his inclusion, alongside four other changes, strengthened the team, and the Welsh Evening Express ahead of the game described him as, "...a young player of fine ability... [and] very smart at getting the ball away to his threequarters." The match, which the Welsh won 14–0, was played in, "...dismal and depressing conditions." With ten minutes left of the game, and Wales leading 11–0, Milroy made a run for the Welsh tryline, but was brought down before crossing the line. When asked for an interview following the match, Milroy responded, "No thanks, I want to get this mud off. Congrats to Wales." Rhys Gabe, the former Welsh centre, reviewed the match for the Evening Express and said of Milroy: "[He] was exceedingly clever with his feet when he helped the forwards in the loose."

In 1910, Milroy participated in the British rugby tour to South Africa, but due to illness only played in three games, none of them tests. His place on the team was secured only after other players made themselves unavailable, and the Welsh Evening Express deemed that the resulting selection was mediocre.

Milroy scored one try for Scotland, in the match against Wales on 3 February 1912.

Scotland played Wales at home on 1 February 1913, in a match that Wales won 0–8. Milroy, according to the Welsh press, was outclassed by Bobby Lloyd, his opposite number, who tackled him several times after he had received the ball back from the scrum.

Milroy did not play in the 1914 fixture against Wales, and the press speculated that his late withdrawal was due to the exclusion of his Watsonian teammates Angus and Pearson from the Scottish side travelling to Cardiff. Nevertheless, he was selected to play in the next fixture, against Ireland in Dublin on 28 February. Moreover, he was appointed captain.

He captained Scotland in the final match before the outbreak of the First World War, at Inverleith in March 1914, which England won by a tight margin.

==== International appearances ====
Opposition	Score	Result	Date	Venue	Ref(s)
Wales	14–0	Lost	5 February 1910	Cardiff	
England	13–8	Lost	18 March 1911	Twickenham	
Wales	21–6	Lost	3 February 1912	Swansea	
Ireland	10–8	Lost	24 February 1912	Lansdowne Road	
England	8–3	Win	16 March 1912	Inverleith	
South Africa	0–16	Lost	23 November 1912	Inverleith	
France	3–21	Win	1 January 1913	Parc des Princes	
Wales	0–8	Lost	1 February 1913	Inverleith	
Ireland	29–14	Win	22 February 1913	Inverleith	
England	3–0	Lost	15 March 1913	Twickenham	
Ireland	6–0	Lost	28 February 1914	Lansdowne Road	
England	15–16	Lost	21 March 1914	Inverleith	

=== Memorial trophies ===
Milroy's life and early death are commemorated on three rugby trophies.

The Eric Milroy Trophy, presented by Milroy's mother to George Watson's College in 1920, continues to be awarded for kicking. Winners have included the Scotland internationals Gavin Hastings and Scott Hastings.

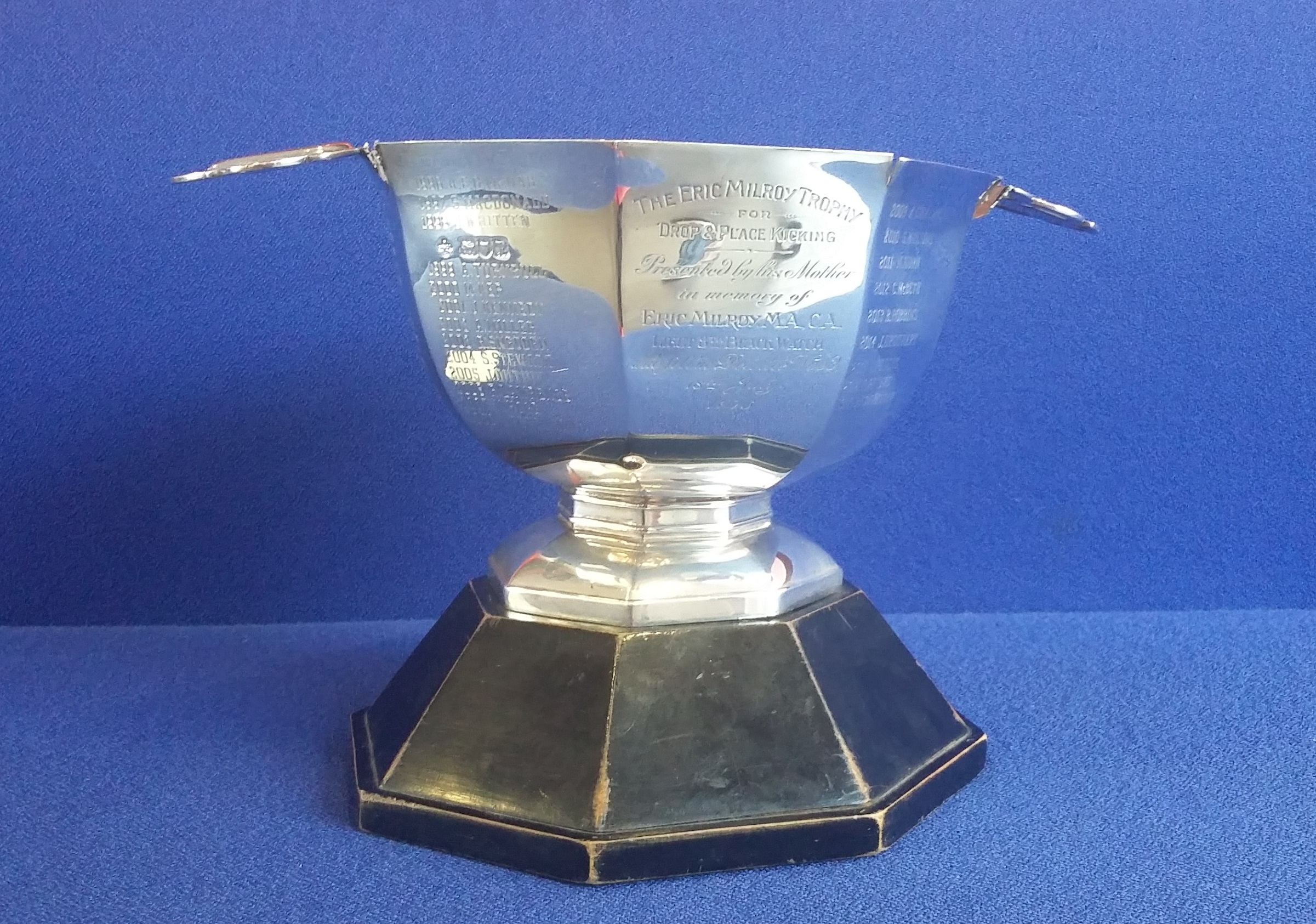
Milroy's Mother Trophy GWC

The Challenge Milroy - Black Watch Trophy, presented by Association Mémoire de Rugby events since 2017, continues to be awarded for veterans and leisure rugby in France or in Scotland every two-year between Amiens, Lorient, SUP'R XV Hauts-de-France, Nivelles, Clermont and Howe of Fife RFC Cupar. This trophy had been created by Christian Raoult.

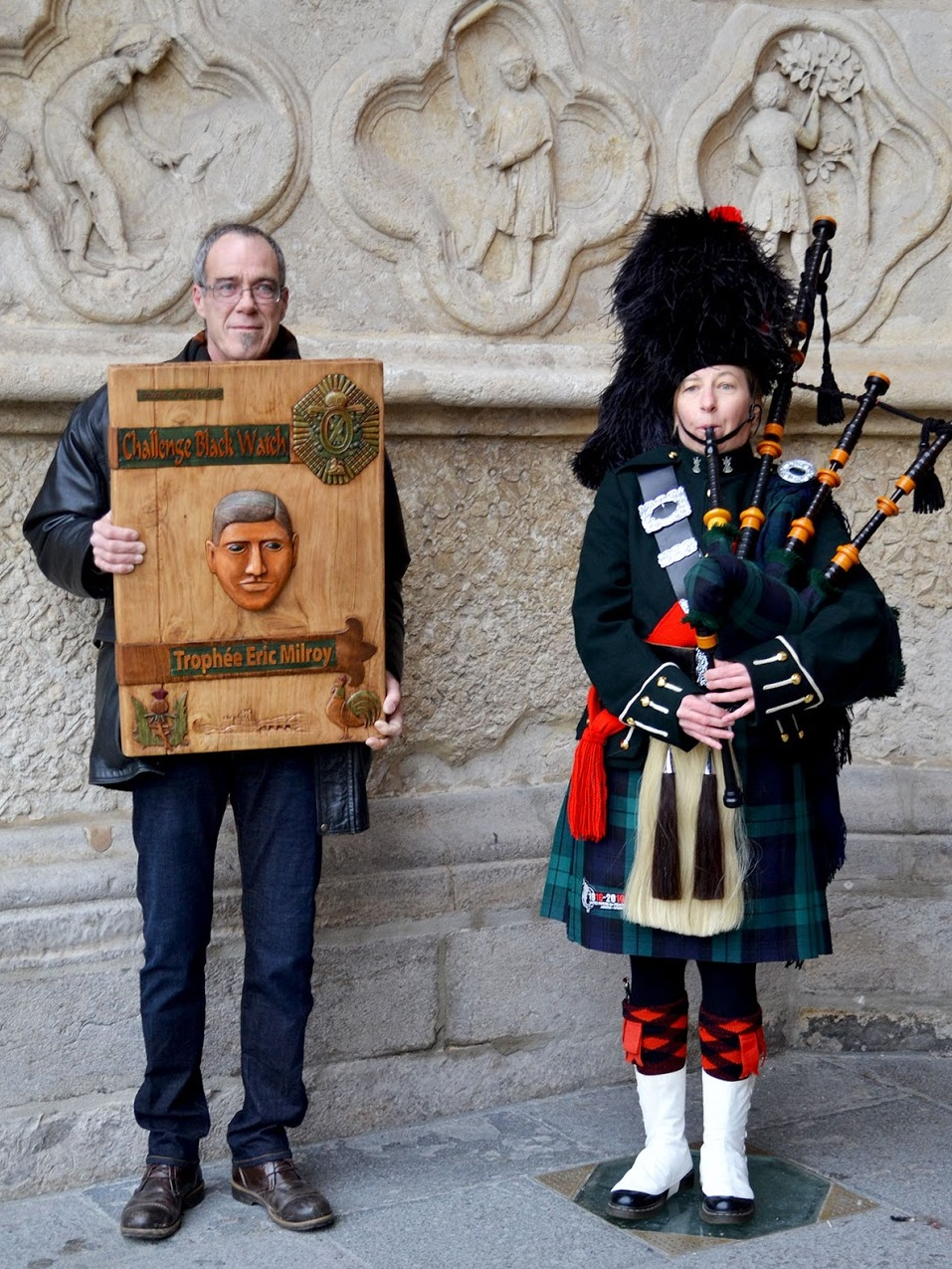
The Milroy's Challenge Black Watch veterans and leisure rugby.

The Auld Alliance Trophy, first presented in 2018 to the winner of the Six Nations match between Scotland and France, honours the French and Scottish rugby players who fell in the First World War. Inscribed on the Trophy are the names of Milroy and of the French aviator Marcel Burgun, Scottish and French captains in 1914. The trophy was carried on to the pitch at Murrayfield on 11 February 2018 by Lachlan Ross and Romain Cabanis, 11-year-old descendants of the families of Milroy and his French counterpart.

== Military service ==
Shortly after the outbreak of the First World War, Milroy joined the 9th Royal Scots from the Watsonian Military Training Corps in September 1914. On 29 December 1914, he was commissioned Second Lieutenant in the 11th Battalion Black Watch. He was sent to the Western Front in October 1915, and was drafted into the 8th Battalion. He was promoted to Lieutenant in June 1916. The 8th was one of five Black Watch battalions involved in the Battle of the Somme, commencing on 1 July 1916. On 14 July, the 8th Black Watch and the 10th Argyll and Sutherland Highlanders, as part of the 26th Brigade of the 9th (Scottish) Division, led the assault on Longueval. By the time Longueval was held some days later, the 8th Black Watch was reduced to 171 men. Milroy went missing in action on 18 July, presumed dead.

His last letter home, written from the trenches, contains a poignant reference to the game of rugby. According to his great nephew, Sir Eric Kinloch Anderson, Milroy's mother never believed he was dead. She believed that he would one day return home to her, and thus kept a light on in the house at night, so that he could find his way up the path. He is remembered on the Thiepval Memorial to the missing soldiers of the Battle of the Somme. In total, 31 Scottish rugby internationals were killed in action in the First World War.

== See also ==
- List of international rugby union players killed in World War I
