= Herbert Leggatt =

Scottish rugby union player

- Born: Herbert Thomas Owen Leggatt; 26 October 1868 Vellore, India
- Died: 23 May 1945 (aged 76) Birkdale, England

Rugby union career
- Position: Forward
Amateur team(s)
Years	Team	Apps	(Points)
- Watsonians
Provincial / State sides
Years	Team	Apps	(Points)
1890	Edinburgh District		
1891	East of Scotland District		
1892	Cities District		
International career
Years	Team	Apps	(Points)
1891–94	Scotland	9	(1)

Herbert Leggatt (26 October 1868 – 23 May 1945) was a Scotland international rugby union player.

== Rugby Union career ==
=== Amateur career ===
He played for Watsonians.

=== Provincial career ===
He played for Edinburgh District in the 1890 inter-city match.

He played for East of Scotland District that same season in 1891.

He played for Cities District against the Anglo-Scots in 1892.

=== International career ===
He made his debut with the national team during the game Scotland v Wales at Edinburgh, 7 Feb 1891. His last game was Scotland v England at Edinburgh, 17 Mar 1894 He played 9 international games between 1891 and 1894.

== Family ==
He was born in Madras Presidency, India on 26 Oct 1868 to George Russell Leggatt and Catherine Ann Pritchard.

== Death ==
Herbert Thomas Owen Leggatt died on 23 May 1945 in Southport, Lancashire, England.
