= 1982 Scotland rugby union tour of Australia =

Summary
P	W	D	L
Total
9	6	0	3
Test match
2	1	0	1
Opponent
P	W	D	L
Australia
2	1	0	1

The 1982 Scotland rugby union tour of Australia was a series of nine matches played by the Scotland national rugby union team in Australia in June and July 1982. The Scotland team won six and lost the other three. They drew the two-match international series against the Australia national rugby union team, winning the first game but losing the second. In their non-international games they were beaten by the Queensland state team and the Sydney representative team. Scotland's win in the first game against Australia was their first victory in the Southern Hemisphere, at the sixth attempt.

== Matches ==
=== Test matches ===
Date and time	Venue	Home	Score	Away
4 July 1982	Ballymore Stadium, Brisbane	Australia	7–12	Scotland
10 July 1982	Sydney Cricket Ground, Sydney	Australia	33–9	Scotland

=== Friendly matches ===
Date	Home team	Score	Away team	Venue	Details
10 June	Queensland Country	16–44	Scotland	Mount Isa, Queensland	
13 June	Queensland	18–7	Scotland	Ballymore, Brisbane, Queensland	
19 June	Sydney	22–13	Scotland	Sydney Cricket Ground, Sydney, New South Wales	
23 June	Victoria	3–38	Scotland	Olympic Park Stadium, Melbourne, Victoria	
26 June	New South Wales	17–31	Scotland	Sydney Cricket Ground, Sydney, New South Wales	
29 June	New South Wales Country	3–44	Scotland	Singleton, New South Wales	
6 July	Australian Capital Territory	4–22	Scotland	Canberra, Australian Capital Territory	

== Touring party ==
- Manager: I. A. A. McGregor
- Assistant manager: Jim Telfer
- Captain: Andy Irvine

=== Backs ===
- Andy Irvine
- Peter Dods
- Roger Baird
- Jim Pollock
- Rick Gordon
- David Johnston
- Keith Robertson
- Craig Williamson
- Bryan Gossman
- John Rutherford
- Gordon Hunter
- Roy Laidlaw

=== Forwards ===
- Derek White
- Iain Paxton
- Finlay Calder
- Jim Calder
- Eric Paxton
- Bill Cuthbertson
- Ian McKie
- Alan Tomes
- Jim Aitken
- Gerry McGuinness
- Iain Milne
- Norrie Rowan
- Colin Deans
- Rob Cunningham
- John Calder replacement during tour
