= Sean McGaughey =

Scottish rugby union player (born 1962)

- Born: Sean Kieran McGaughey; 8 May 1962 (age 64) Dumfries, Scotland

Rugby union career
- Position: Flanker
Amateur team(s)
Years	Team	Apps	(Points)
- Hawick
Provincial / State sides
Years	Team	Apps	(Points)
- South of Scotland District
International career
Years	Team	Apps	(Points)
1984	Scotland 'B'	1	(0)
1984	Scotland	1	(0)
1984	Barbarians	1	(0)

Sean McGaughey (born 8 May 1962) is a former Scottish international rugby union player who played for the Scotland national team.

== Rugby Union career ==
=== Amateur career ===
McGaughey played for Hawick.

=== Provincial career ===
He played for South of Scotland District in Scottish Inter-District Championship. He won the 1983–84 Scottish Inter-District Championship with the South team.

=== International career ===
He was capped by Scotland 'B' once, on 19 February 1984 against France 'B'. Scotland 'B' won the match 13-10. McGaughey was replaced by his club captain Billy Murray in the match. McGaughey was injured and taken to hospital, but luckily he was only diagnosed with a bruised back.

He was capped once by the full senior Scotland side in 1984. He played against Romania. Romania won 28-22 and it was McGaughey's only senior cap.

Prior to the match he got bored and did 21 pull ups from his hotel balcony to celebrate his 21st birthday. He was 9 floors up.

He went on the 1985 Scotland rugby union tour of North America and 1988 Scotland rugby union tour of Zimbabwe, but these were non-cap matches.

He played for the Barbarians in 1984.
