= 1981 Scotland rugby union tour of New Zealand =

- Manager: Ken Smith
- Tour captain: Andy Irvine
- Top point scorer: Andy Irvine (56)
Summary
P	W	D	L
Total
8	4	0	4
Test match
2	0	0	2
Opponent
P	W	D	L
New Zealand
2	0	0	2

The 1981 Scotland rugby union tour of New Zealand was a series of eight matches played by the Scotland national rugby union team in New Zealand in May and June 1981. The Scotland team won five of their matches and lost the other three. They lost both international matches against the New Zealand national rugby union team (the All Blacks).

== Touring party ==
- Manager: Ken Smith
- Assistant Manager: Jim Telfer
- Captain: Andy Irvine

=== Backs ===
- Andy Irvine
- Peter Dods
- Steve Munro
- Bruce Hay
- Roger Baird
- Richard Breakey
- Alastair Cranston
- Jim Renwick
- John Rutherford
- Ron Wilson
- Roy Laidlaw
- Gordon Hunter
- Alan Lawson (replacement during tour)

=== Forwards ===
- Derek White
- Iain Paxton
- Peter Lillington
- Jim Calder
- Gordon Dickson
- David Leslie
- Bill Cuthbertson
- Tom Smith
- Alan Tomes
- Jim Aitken
- Gerry McGuinness
- Iain Milne
- Norrie Rowan
- Colin Deans
- Kenneth Lawrie

== Results ==
Scores and results list Scotland's points tally first.

Opponent	Result	For	Against	Date	Venue
King Country	Won	39	13	27 May	Taumarunui Domain, Taumarunui
Wellington	Lost	15	19	30 May	Athletic Park, Wellington
Wairarapa-Bush	Won	32	9	3 June	Memorial Park, Masterton
Canterbury	Won	23	12	6 June	Lancaster Park, Christchurch
Mid Canterbury	Won	23	12	9 June	Ashburton
NEW ZEALAND	Lost	4	11	13 June	Carisbrook, Dunedin
Marlborough	Won	38	9	16 June	Lansdowne Park, Blenheim
NEW ZEALAND	Lost	15	40	20 June	Eden Park, Auckland

== Matches ==
27 May 1981

King Country	13-39	Scotland XV
Try: Pye; Pen: Lang (3)		Try: Irvine; McGuinness; Leslie; Hunter; Con: Irvine (4); Pen: Irvine (4); Drop: Wilson

Taumarunui

30 May 1981

Wellington	19-15	Scotland XV
Try: Fraser (2); Gard'ner; Con: Hewson (2); Pen: Hewson		Try: Cuthbertson; Con: Dods; Pen: Dods (2); Drop: Rutherford

Athletic Park, Wellington

3 June 1981

Wairarapa-Bush	9-32	Scotland XV
Try: Sargent; Con: Kjestrup; Pen: Kjestrup		Try: Irvine (2); Hay; Breakey; Con: Irvine (2); Pen: Irvine (3); Drop: Irvine

Memorial Park, Masterton

6 June 1981

Canterbury	12-23	Scotland XV
Try: Smith; Con: Deans; Pen: Deans (2)		Try: Munro; Laidlaw; Pen: Dods (4); Drop: Rutherford

Christchurch

9 June 1981

Mid Canterbury	12-23	Scotland XV
Try: Wilson; Con: Holmes; Pen: Holmes (2)		Try: Breakey; Munro; Leslie; Lawson; Drop: Wilson

Ashburton

== First Test ==
13 June 1981

New Zealand	11-4	Scotland
Try: Loveridge; Wilson; Pen: Hewson		Try: Deans

Carisbrook
Attendance: 18,000
Referee: R. G. Byres (Australia)

NEW ZEALAND: A. R. Hewson (Wellington), S. S. Wilson (Wellington), B. J. Robertson (Counties), A. C. R. Jefferd (East Coast), B. G. Fraser (Wellington), E. Dunn (North Auckland), D. S. Loveridge (Taranaki); M. G. Mexted (Wellington), G. N. K. Mourie (Taranaki) (c), G. Higginson (Canterbury), H. Rickit (Waikato), M. W. Shaw (Manawatu), G. A. Knight (Manawatu), A. G. Dalton (Counties), R. C. Ketels (Counties).

SCOTLAND: A. R. Irvine (Heriot's F. P.) (c), S. Munro (Ayr), A. G. Cranston (Hawick), J. M. Renwick (Hawick), B. H. Hay (Boroughmuir), J. Y. Rutherford (Selkirk), R. J. Laidlaw (Jedforest); I. A. M. Paxton (Selkirk), D. G. Leslie (Gala), W. Cuthbertson (Kilmarnock), A. J. Tomes (Hawick), J. M. Calder (Stewart's-Melville F. P.), I. G. Milne (Heriot's F. P.), C. T. Deans (Hawick), J. Aitken (Gala).

This was the only one of the tour matches in which Scotland did not score a drop goal.

16 June 1981

Marlborough	9-38	Scotland XV
Pen: Marfell (3)		Try: Baird (2); Lawson; Dods; Hay; Rowan; Con: Dods; Pen: Dods (2); Drop: Wilson (2)

Landsdowne Park, Blenheim

== Second Test ==
20 June 1981

New Zealand	40-15	Scotland
Try: Wilson (3); Hewson (2); Mourie; Robertson; Con: Hewson (6)		Try: Hay; Con: Irvine; Pen: Irvine (2); Drop: Renwick

Eden Park
Attendance: 44,000
Referee: C. K. Collett (Australia)

NEW ZEALAND: A. R. Hewson (Wellington), S. S. Wilson (Wellington), B. J. Robertson (Counties), A. C. R. Jefferd (East Coast), B. G. Fraser (Wellington), D. L. Rollerson (Manawatu), D. S. Loveridge (Taranaki); M. G. Mexted (Wellington), G. N. K. Mourie (Taranaki) (c), A. M. Haden (Auckland), H. Rickit (Waikato), M. W. Shaw (Manawatu), G. A. Knight (Manawatu), A. G. Dalton (Counties), R. C. Ketels (Counties).

SCOTLAND: A. R. Irvine (Heriot's F. P.) (c), S. Munro (Ayr), A. G. Cranston (Hawick), J. M. Renwick (Hawick), B. H. Hay (Boroughmuir), J. Y. Rutherford (Selkirk), R. J. Laidlaw (Jedforest); I. A. M. Paxton (Selkirk), D. G. Leslie (Gala), W. Cuthbertson (Kilmarnock), A. J. Tomes (Hawick), J. M. Calder (Stewart's-Melville F. P.), I. G. Milne (Heriot's F. P.), C. T. Deans (Hawick), J. Aitken (Gala).

22–6 down after 13 minutes of the second half, Scotland closed the gap to 22–15 with seven minutes to go, only for New Zealand to score three converted tries to win the match comfortably. This was the highest score ever recorded by New Zealand in a full international.
