= John Tod (rugby union) =

Scotland international rugby union player

- Born: John Tod; 9 October 1862 Crieff, Scotland
- Died: 9 September 1935 (aged 72) Strathpeffer, Scotland

Rugby union career
- Position: Forward
Amateur team(s)
Years	Team	Apps	(Points)
- Edinburgh University
- Watsonians
Provincial / State sides
Years	Team	Apps	(Points)
1883	East of Scotland District		
1883-85	Edinburgh District		
International career
Years	Team	Apps	(Points)
1884-86	Scotland	9	(2 tries)

John Tod (8 October 1862 – 8 September 1935) was a Scotland international rugby union player. He was nicknamed 'The Prince of Dribblers' and it is said that he introduced the dribbling game to rugby union. Tod, himself, rated the later Watsonian player and Scotland international William Cownie as a much better dribbler of the rugby ball than he was, saying that Cownie was the prettiest dribbler he had ever seen touch a rugby ball.

== Rugby Union career ==
=== Amateur career ===
He played for Edinburgh University and then Watsonians. A letter to The Scotsman on Tod's death by a "D.P.M" relayed this information:

As stated in your columns on Tuesday Dr John Tod, who died suddenly on Monday while on holiday at Strathpeffer, Ross-shire, was in his younger days an international Rugby forward. John Tod was the first Watsonian to get an international cap. After playing for Edinburgh University, he joined the Watsonians, and captained the side in 1883-4 and 1884-5. His first game for Scotland was in 1884, when we gained a victory over Wales at Newport. He was capped eight times [sic] in all. Writing in the Jubilee number of "The Watsonian " summer term 1920 "R.M." made reference to Tod's prowess as a player : "During his captaincy his motto was, 'Hard training and unselfishness.' — he would not have a man in his team who would not pass to his neighbour. It was he who introduced the dribbling game to Scottish Rugby. [...] The Watsonian forwards were from that time a power in the land."

=== Provincial career ===
He played for East of Scotland District in their trial match against West of Scotland District in January 1883.

He played for Edinburgh District in the 1883, 1884 and 1885 inter-city matches against Glasgow District.

=== International career ===
He was capped 9 times - and not 8 times as "D.P.M." counted above - for Scotland in the period 1884 to 1886. He scored 2 tries.

== Medical career ==
He became a G.P. and practiced in Leith. He was prominent in Masonic circles in Edinburgh.

== Family ==
His father was James Robertson Tod (1827-1901) and his mother Ann Campbell (1824-1912). He was one of their 7 children.

He married Mary Bennett in 1907.

== Death ==
He died on holiday at Strathpeffer on the local golf course. Tod was a regular attendee of the Strathpeffer Spa. The Scotsman reported that he had played only one stroke on the golf course before collapsing dead. The Daily Mirror used the headline grabbling line: "First stroke his last" in reporting his death.
