= Rick Gordon =

Scotland international rugby union player

- Born: Richard John Gordon; 16 March 1958 (age 68) Lahore, Pakistan

Rugby union career
- Position: Centre
Amateur team(s)
Years	Team	Apps	(Points)
- London Scottish
Provincial / State sides
Years	Team	Apps	(Points)
- Anglo-Scots
International career
Years	Team	Apps	(Points)
1982	Scotland 'B'	1	(0)
1982	Scotland	2	(0)

Richard John Gordon (born 16 March 1958) is a former Scotland international rugby union player. He played at Centre.

== Rugby Union career ==
=== Amateur career ===
He played for London Scottish.

=== Provincial career ===
He was capped by Anglo-Scots district.

=== International career ===
He received one cap for Scotland 'B' against France 'B' on 7 February 1982.

He later received 2 full senior caps with Scotland; both in 1982 and both against Australia on the 1982 Scotland rugby union tour of Australia.
