= David Bertram =

Scotland international rugby union player

- Born: David Minto Bertram; 24 January 1899 Edinburgh, Scotland
- Died: 19 April 1975 (aged 76) Nairobi, Kenya

Rugby union career
- Position: Hooker
Amateur team(s)
Years	Team	Apps	(Points)
-	Watsonians		
Provincial / State sides
Years	Team	Apps	(Points)
1921	Edinburgh District		
1921	Scotland Probables		
International career
Years	Team	Apps	(Points)
1922-24	Scotland	11	(8)

David Bertram (24 January 1899 – 19 April 1975) was a Scotland international rugby union player.

== Rugby Union career ==
=== Amateur career ===
Bertram played for Watsonians.

=== Provincial career ===
He played for Edinburgh District.

He played for Scotland Probables in their match against Provinces District on 10 December 1921, and for the Probables for their match against Scotland Possibles on 24 December 1921.

=== International career ===
He played for Scotland 11 times from 1922 to 1924.

== Medical career ==
He became a doctor, along with brother, William Darling Bertram, in London.

== Other interests ==
Both David and his brother William were car enthusiasts. David had a Triumph TR3 and William had a BMW Isetta. They entered the Lothian Car Gymkhana in 1957. David, in his TR3, had the best performance in all the tests, with a time of 194.6 seconds; and winning the Class 3 open section.

== Family ==
His father was John Watson Bertram (1869-1944), and his mother was Margaret Bowie Darling (1873-1947).
