= Kenneth Lawrie =

Scotland international rugby union player

- Born: Kenneth Gunter Lawrie; 31 July 1951 (age 75) Galashiels, Scotland

Rugby union career
- Position: Hooker
Amateur team(s)
Years	Team	Apps	(Points)
- Gala
Provincial / State sides
Years	Team	Apps	(Points)
- South of Scotland
International career
Years	Team	Apps	(Points)
1978-80	Scotland 'B'	3	
1980	Scotland	3	(0)

Kenneth Lawrie (born 31 July 1951) is a former Scotland international rugby union player. He played at hooker.

== Rugby Union career ==
=== Amateur career ===
He played for Gala.

=== Provincial career ===
He played for South of Scotland.

=== International career ===
He was capped 3 times by Scotland 'B', from 1978 to 1980. His first 'B' cap came against France 'B' on 19 March 1978.

He was capped 3 times by Scotland, all of the caps coming in 1980.

He went on the 1981 Scotland rugby union tour of New Zealand.
