= 1988 Scotland rugby union tour of Zimbabwe =

Summary
P	W	D	L
Total
5	5	0	0
Test match
2	2	0	0
Opponent
P	W	D	L
Zimbabwe
2	2	0	0

The 1988 Scotland rugby union tour of Zimbabwe was a series of five matches played by the Scotland national rugby union team in Zimbabwe in May 1988. The Scotland team won all five of their matches including the two internationals against the Zimbabwe national rugby union team.

== Preparations ==
Scott Hastings and David Milne picked up injuries and withdrew before departure.

== Matches ==
Scores and results list Scotland's points tally first.

Opponent	Result	For	Against	Date	Venue
Mashonaland	Won	16	12	14 May	Police Ground, Harare
Goshawks	Won	48	6	18 May	Mutare
ZIMBABWE	Won	31	10	21 May	Hartsfield Ground, Bulawayo
Mashonaland Country Districts	Won	53	6	25 May	Kadoma
ZIMBABWE	Won	34	7	28 May	Police Ground, Harare

== Touring party ==
- Manager: J. B. Steven
- Coach: Richie Dixon
- Assistant coach: David Johnston
- Captain: Peter Dods

=== Backs ===
- Peter Dods
- Ian Ramsey
- Matt Duncan
- Stewart McAslan
- Ruari McLean
- Alex Moore
- Derek Stark
- Douglas Wyllie
- Colin Gass
- Craig Chalmers
- Richard Cramb
- G. MacGregor

=== Forwards ===
- Paul Burnell
- David Butcher
- George Graham
- C. Brown
- Jim Hay
- Damian Cronin
- Chris Gray
- Jeremy Richardson
- D. Leckie
- Sean McGaughey
- Hugh Parker
- Kevin Rafferty
- Derek Turnbull
