= 2004 Scotland rugby union tour of Oceania =

Summary
P	W	D	L
Total
6	2	0	4
Test match
3	1	0	2
Opponent
P	W	D	L
Samoa
1	1	0	0
Australia
2	0	0	2

The 2004 Scotland rugby union tour of Oceania was a series of matches played in May and June 2004 in Australia and New Zealand by Scotland national rugby union team.

All the matches were played in Australia, except for the test with Samoa, which was played in Wellington (New Zealand)

== Results ==
29 May 2004

Queensland	41–5	Scotland XV

Ballymore, Brisbane

2 June 2004

New South Wales Country	10–48	Scotland XV

4 June 2004

Samoa	3–38	Scotland
Pen: Warren		Try: Blair, Hinshelwood; Hogg, Ross; Webster; Con: Parks, Paterson; Pen: Paterson 3

Westpac Stadium, Wellington
Referee: Kelvin Deaker (New Zealand)

Samoa: 15. Tanner Vili, 14. Lome Fa'atau, 13. Dale Rasmussen, 12. Brian Lima, 11. Sailosi Tagicakibau, 10. Roger Warren, 9. Steve So'oialo, 8. Semo Sititi (c), 7. Ulia Ulia, 6. Siaosi Vaili, 5. Opeta Palepoi, 4. Leo Lafaiali'i, 3. Tamato Leupolu, 2. Jonathan Meredith, 1. Kas Lealamanu'a – Replacements: 17. Simon Lemalu, 18. Kitiona Viliamu, 19. Michael von Dincklage, 20. John Senio, 20. John Senio, 22. David Lemi – Unused: 16. Loleni Tafunai, 21. Mussolini Schuster
Scotland: 15. Chris Paterson (c), 14. Sean Lamont, 13. Ben Hinshelwood, 12. Andrew Henderson, 11. Simon Webster, 10. Gordon Ross, 9. Chris Cusiter, 8. Ally Hogg, 7. Donnie Macfadyen, 6. Jason White, 5. Stuart Grimes, 4. Scott Murray, 3. Bruce Douglas, 2. Gordon Bulloch, 1. Tom Smith – Replacements: 16. Steve Scott, 17. Craig Smith, 18. Iain Fullarton, 19. Jon Petrie, 20. Mike Blair, 21. Dan Parks, 22. Hugo Southwell

8 June 2004

Waratahs (New South Wales)	33–15	Scotland XV

Stadium Australia, Sydney

13 June 2004

Australia	35–15	Scotland
Try: Giteau, Sailor; Tuqiri (2); Con: Burke, Roff (2); Pen: Roff (3)		Pen: Parks (5)

Docklands Stadium, Melbourne
Attendance: 38,000
Referee: Paul Honiss (New Zealand)

Australia: 15. Joe Roff, 14. Wendell Sailor, 13. Clyde Rathbone, 12. Matt Giteau, 11. Lote Tuqiri, 10. Stephen Larkham, 9. George Gregan (c), 8. David Lyons, 7. George Smith, 6. Radike Samo, 5. Nathan Sharpe, 4. Justin Harrison, 3. Al Baxter, 2. Brendan Cannon, 1. Bill Young – Replacements: 16. Jeremy Paul, 17. Matt Dunning, 18. Dan Vickerman, 19. Phil Waugh, 20. Morgan Turinui, 21. Matt Burke, 22. Chris Latham
Scotland: 15. Hugo Southwell, 14. Sean Lamont, 13. Ben Hinshelwood, 12. Andrew Henderson, 11. Simon Webster, 10. Dan Parks, 9. Chris Cusiter, 8. Ally Hogg, 7. Donnie Macfadyen, 6. Jason White, 5. Stuart Grimes, 4. Scott Murray (c), 3. Bruce Douglas, 2. Gordon Bulloch, 1. Tom Smith – Replacements: 16. Steve Scott, 17. Craig Smith, 18. Iain Fullarton, 19. Jon Petrie, 20. Mike Blair, 21. Gordon Ross, 22. Graeme Morrison

19 June 2004

Australia	34–13	Scotland
Try: Roff, Sailor; Tuqiri (2), Turinui; Con: Roff (3); Pen: Roff		Try: Cusiter; Con: Parks; Pen: Parks (2)

Stadium Australia, Sydney
Attendance: 56,000
Referee: Mark Lawrence (South Africa)

Australia: 15. Joe Roff, 14. Wendell Sailor, 13. Stirling Mortlock, 12. Morgan Turinui, 11. Lote Tuqiri, 10. Stephen Larkham, 9. George Gregan (c), 8. David Lyons, 7. Phil Waugh, 6. Radike Samo, 5. Nathan Sharpe, 4. Justin Harrison, 3. Al Baxter, 2. Brendan Cannon, 1. Bill Young – Replacements: 16. Jeremy Paul, 17. Matt Dunning, 18. Dan Vickerman, 19. George Smith, 21. Clyde Rathbone, 22. Chris Latham – Unused: 20. Matt Henjak
Scotland: 15. Hugo Southwell, 14. Sean Lamont, 13. Ben Hinshelwood, 12. Andrew Henderson, 11. Simon Webster, 10. Dan Parks, 9. Chris Cusiter, 8. Ally Hogg, 7. Donnie Macfadyen, 6. Jason White, 5. Iain Fullarton, 4. Scott Murray (c), 3. Bruce Douglas, 2. Gordon Bulloch, 1. Tom Smith – Replacements: 17. Craig Smith, 18. Craig Hamilton, 19. Jon Petrie, 19. Jon Petrie, 21. Gordon Ross, 22. Graeme Morrison – Unused: 16. Steve Scott, 20. Mike Blair
