= Peter Lillington =

Scottish rugby union player

- Born: Peter Murray Lillington c. 1959 (age 66–67) Ely, Cambridgeshire, England

Rugby union career
- Position: Flanker
Amateur team(s)
Years	Team	Apps	(Points)
- Durham University
–	Cambridge University		
–	Harlequins		
Provincial / State sides
Years	Team	Apps	(Points)
- Anglo-Scots
International career
Years	Team	Apps	(Points)
1981-82	Scotland 'B'	2	(0)

Peter Murray Lillington (born 1959) is a Scottish former rugby union player who played as a flanker.

He represented Scotland 'B' twice and was a member of the senior Scotland squad on the 1981 tour of New Zealand.

== Early life and education ==
Lillington was born in Ely, Cambridgeshire, in 1959, the son of former sprinter Alan Lillington. He studied at Durham University, where he was a member of Hatfield College and played for Durham University RFC. He subsequently continued his studies at Magdalene College, Cambridge, representing Cambridge University R.U.F.C.

== Rugby career ==
At club level, Lillington played for Harlequins, and represented the Anglo-Scots in the Scottish Inter-District Championship.

Lillington was selected for the Scotland tour of New Zealand in 1981. He initially withdrew because the tour conflicted with his university examinations, but was recalled to the squad in June after completing them.

He also made two appearances for Scotland 'B', both against France 'B', in 1981 and 1982.
