= Jimmy Carmichael (rugby union) =

Scotland international rugby union player

- Born: James Howden Carmichael; 22 March 1900 Edinburgh, Scotland
- Died: 4 January 1990 (aged 89) Edinburgh, Scotland

Rugby union career
- Position: Wing
Amateur team(s)
Years	Team	Apps	(Points)
- Watsonians
Provincial / State sides
Years	Team	Apps	(Points)
1920	Edinburgh District		
International career
Years	Team	Apps	(Points)
1921	Scotland	3	(0)

Jimmy Carmichael (22 March 1900 – 4 January 1990) was a Scotland international rugby union player.

== Rugby Union career ==
=== Amateur career ===
He played rugby union for Watsonians.

=== Provincial career ===
He played for Edinburgh District in the 1920 inter-city match.

=== International career ===
He received 3 caps for Scotland in 1921.

== Family ==
He was born to Duncan Smith Carmichael (1870-1933) and Jane Ann Jackson Howden (1873-1947). He married Vera Margaret Wood Hawks (1900-1990) in 1926.

His son Dennis also played for Watsonians. He is a noted administrator for the club, a former president, and Team Secretary and Honorary President. He won a Lifetime Achievement Award by the SRU.
