= Alec Robertson (rugby union) =

Scotland international rugby union player

- Born: Alexander Weir Robertson; 11 December 1877 Edinburgh, Scotland
- Died: 28 October 1941 (aged 63) Gullane, Scotland

Rugby union career
- Position: Centre
Amateur team(s)
Years	Team	Apps	(Points)
- Watsonians
–	Edinburgh Academicals		
Provincial / State sides
Years	Team	Apps	(Points)
1896	Edinburgh District		
International career
Years	Team	Apps	(Points)
1897	Scotland	1	(0)

Alec Robertson (11 December 1877 – 28 October 1941) was a Scotland international rugby union player.

== Rugby Union career ==
=== Amateur career ===
He played for Watsonians in 1896.

Robertson played rugby union for Edinburgh Academicals in 1897.

=== Provincial career ===
He played for Edinburgh District in their inter-city match against Glasgow District in 1896.

=== International career ===
Robertson was capped once by Scotland, in 1897.

== Outside of rugby union ==
He was one of the landed gentry with the family name of Robertson-Durham. He was a chartered accountant and Justice of the Peace.

He died in 1941 and is buried in the graveyard of Dirleton Kirk.
