= David Deas (rugby union) =

Scotland international rugby union player

- Born: David Wallace Deas; 30 March 1919
- Died: 7 December 2001 (aged 82)

Rugby union career
- Position: Number 8
Amateur team(s)
Years	Team	Apps	(Points)
- Watsonians
Provincial / State sides
Years	Team	Apps	(Points)
- Edinburgh District
International career
Years	Team	Apps	(Points)
1947	Scotland	2	(0)

David Wallace Deas (30 March 1919 – 7 December 2001) was a Scotland international rugby union player.

== Rugby Union career ==
=== Amateur career ===
He played for Watsonians.

=== Provincial career ===
He was capped for Edinburgh District.

=== International career ===
He was capped two times for Scotland.
