= Sandy Gillies =

Scotland international rugby union player

- Full name: Alexander Campbell Gillies
- Born: 25 March 1900 Easdale, Argyll, Scotland
- Died: 22 January 1980 (aged 79)
- Height: 6 ft 6 in (198 cm)
- School: George Watson's College
- University: University of Edinburgh
- Occupation: Medical doctor

Rugby union career
- Position: No. 8
International career
Years	Team	Apps	(Points)
1924–27	Scotland	12	(26)

Alexander Campbell Gillies (25 March 1900 — 22 January 1980) was a Scottish international rugby union player.

Born in Easdale, Argyll, Gilles was educated at George Watson's College and the University of Edinburgh.

Gilles was a towering number eight, standing at 6 ft 6 in. Known for his kicking abilities, Gilles was adept at the dribble kick and an accurate place kicker, often utilised for the longer shots. He gained 12 Scotland caps from 1924 to 1927. This included their 1925 Five Nations grand slam, during which he contributed a try against France and converted the first ever try scored at Murrayfield, in their Calcutta Cup encounter. He played for Watsonians RFC while a medical student in Edinburgh, then moved to England, playing for Manchester, Cheshire and Cumberland.

== See also ==
- List of Scotland national rugby union players
