= Robert Finlay (rugby union) =

Scottish rugby union player (1923–1979)

- Born: Robert Finlay; 9 April 1923 Edinburgh, Scotland
- Died: 8 October 1979 (aged 56)

Rugby union career
- Position: Lock
Amateur team(s)
Years	Team	Apps	(Points)
- Watsonians
Provincial / State sides
Years	Team	Apps	(Points)
- Edinburgh District
International career
Years	Team	Apps	(Points)
1948	Scotland	1	(0)

Robert Finlay (9 April 1923 – 8 October 1979) was a Scotland international rugby union player.

== Rugby Union career ==
=== Amateur career ===
Finlay played for Watsonians.

=== Provincial career ===
He was capped by Edinburgh District to play against Glasgow District in the inter-city match of 1947.

=== International career ===
He was capped once for Scotland in 1948.
