= 1996 Scotland rugby union tour of New Zealand =

- Manager: Jim Telfer
- Tour captain: Rob Wainwright
Summary
P	W	D	L
Total
8	4	0	4
Test match
2	0	0	2
Opponent
P	W	D	L
New Zealand
2	0	0	2

== Results ==
Scores and results list Scotland's points tally first.

Opponent	For	Against	Date	Venue	Status
Wanganui	49	13	28 May 1996	Cooks Gardens, Wanganui	Tour match
Northland	10	15	31 May 1996	Okara Park, Whangarei	Tour match
Waikato	35	39	5 June 1996	Rugby Park, Hamilton	Tour match
Southland	31	21	8 June 1996	Homestead Rugby Stadium, Invercargill	Tour match
South Island Divisional XV	63	21	11 June 1996	Lansdowne Park, Blenheim	Tour match
New Zealand	31	62	15 June 1996	Carisbrook, Dunedin	Test match
Bay of Plenty	35	31	18 June 1996	Rotorua International Stadium, Rotorua	Tour match
New Zealand	12	36	22 June 1996	Eden Park, Auckland	Test match

== See also ==
- History of rugby union matches between New Zealand and Scotland
