= Peter Steven =

Scotland international rugby union player

- Born: Peter David Steven; 4 July 1959 (age 67) Kilwinning, Scotland

Rugby union career
- Position: Wing
Amateur team(s)
Years	Team	Apps	(Points)
- Heriot's
Provincial / State sides
Years	Team	Apps	(Points)
- Edinburgh District
1986	Combined Scottish Districts		
International career
Years	Team	Apps	(Points)
1983-85	Scotland B	4	(0)
1984-85	Scotland	4	(0)

Peter Steven (born 4 July 1959 in Kilwinning) is a former Scotland international rugby union player.

== Rugby Union career ==
=== Amateur career ===
Steven played for Heriot's.

=== Provincial career ===
He represented Edinburgh District.

He played for Combined Scottish Districts on 1 March 1986 against South of Scotland.

=== International career ===
Steven received a Scotland 'B' on 19 March 1983.

He went on to be capped by the senior Scotland side 4 times.
