= Derek Turnbull (rugby union) =

Scotland international rugby union player

- Born: Derek James Turnbull; 2 October 1961 (age 65) Hawick, Scotland
- Height: 193 cm (6 ft 4 in)
- Weight: 94 kg (14st 7.7lb)

Rugby union career
- Position: Flanker
Amateur team(s)
Years	Team	Apps	(Points)
- Hawick Trades
- Hawick RFC
Provincial / State sides
Years	Team	Apps	(Points)
- South of Scotland
-	Reds Trial		
International career
Years	Team	Apps	(Points)
1987-1994	Scotland	15	(9)

Derek Turnbull (born 2 October 1961) is a former Scotland international rugby union player.

== Rugby Union career ==
=== Amateur career ===
Turnbull was born in Hawick. He started playing rugby union with Hawick Trades before being picked up by Hawick.

=== Provincial career ===
He played for South of Scotland.

He played for the Reds Trial side in their match against Blues Trial on 3 January 1987.

=== International career ===
He made 15 appearances for the Scotland national rugby union team.

He made his international rugby debut on 6 June 1987 in the quarter-finals of the 1987 Rugby World Cup against New Zealand at Christchurch. He went on the 1988 tour of Zimbabwe, although full caps were not awarded. He was also on the 1990 tour of New Zealand. His last appearance was against Wales in Cardiff 1994.

== Policing career ==
Turnbull became a police officer. He was honoured with a chief constable's commendation for his bravery after saving a pensioner from an escaped bull in Galashiels in November 2006.
