= David Leslie (rugby union) =

Scotland international rugby union player

- Born: David George Leslie; 14 April 1952 (age 74) Dundee, Scotland
- Height: 1.96 m (6 ft 5 in)
- Weight: 95.4 kg (210 lb; 15 st 0 lb)

Rugby union career
- Position: No. 8
Amateur team(s)
Years	Team	Apps	(Points)
- Dundee HSFP
–	Gala		
Provincial / State sides
Years	Team	Apps	(Points)
- North and Midlands
-	Scotland Possibles		
-	Scotland Probables		
International career
Years	Team	Apps	(Points)
1974-75	Scotland 'B'	2	
1975-85	Scotland	32	(0)

David Leslie (born 14 April 1952) is a former Scotland international rugby union player. He usually played at number eight, but occasionally as flanker. He played for Scotland 32 times between 1975 and 1985.

== Rugby Union career ==
=== Amateur career ===
Leslie went to school at High School of Dundee and Glenalmond College. He went on to play for Dundee HSFP.

Leslie then played for Gala, which he captained.

=== Provincial career ===
Leslie played for North and Midlands. He was part of the North and Midlands side that shared the Scottish Inter-District Championship (with Glasgow District) in 1974–75 season.

Leslie played in the trial match of 11 January 1975 in the Scotland Possibles side. It was a strange match. It was split into 3 thirds of 30 minutes each. Total playing time was 100 minutes with extra time when each third reached full time. The Possibles raced into an early commanding lead, but player shifts saw the Scotland Probables side come back into the match. One of those player shifts was putting Leslie into the Probables side in the second third, with the Glasgow Herald noting that he had an excellent game throughout. Although the Probables eventually took a one-point lead in the match, the Possibles fought back at the end to win.

=== International career ===
Leslie played twice for Scotland 'B' in 1974 - 75 while still with Dundee HSFP.

Leslie's first cap was against Ireland in 1975 but did not become a regular on the Scotland squad until 1981.

Leslie spent much of his playing time injured, missing the 1977, 1978, 1979 Five Nations, and half of the 1980 season. He broke a leg in 1982, missing the 1982 Scotland rugby union tour of Australia.

Leslie scored Scotland's first try against Romania in 1984, only his second for Scotland.

In controversy, Leslie was left out the 1983 British Lions tour to New Zealand. In 1984, he was voted Rugby World's "Player of the Season", the only ever Scottish winner, following his performances as an ever-present in the Grand Slam winning team of that year.

Richard Bath writes:

Throughout his career, he was consistently the most focussed and fearless player in a Scottish squad which had more than its fair share of fearless breakaways... for all his intensity, Leslie found it hard to establish himself in the Scottish side until late on in his career.

Allan Massie considered that:

Leslie's first quality is courage. All back-row forwards have to be brave, but Leslie's courage defies reason and probability alike, he reckons any ball on the ground is his to win. The courage is so blinding that one is apt to overlook the skill, judgement and timing with which he launches himself at such balls and attaches himself to them. He is in fact a very skilful educated player. He often played fly-half in his schooldays. He gives and takes a pass better than most of the Scottish three-quarter line. He has acquired the knack of dipping his shoulder into the tackler and slipping the ball at the same moment to a supporting player. He kicks well. Perhaps though his greatest asset with the ball in his hand, is his intuitive knowledge of what is right. Jim Telfer has said that he can stop worrying when Leslie has the ball, being 99 per cent sure that he will out it to the best use possible. This is a quality that many of even the best and most spectacular of back-row men never acquire.
