= Iain Fullarton =

Scotland international rugby union player

- Born: 25 April 1976 (age 50)
- School: Merchiston Castle School

Rugby union career
- Position: Lock
Senior career
Years	Team	Apps	(Points)
1996–2001	Edinburgh		
2001–2004	Sale Sharks		
2004–2008	Saracens F.C.		
2008-2010	London Scottish		
International career
Years	Team	Apps	(Points)
2000-2006	Scotland	8	

Iain Fullarton (born 25 April 1976) is a former Scottish rugby union player. His regular playing position was Lock.

== Club career ==
Fullarton was educated at St. Mary's School, Melrose, Merchiston Castle School and the University of Aberdeen. While at Merchiston Castle School he appeared for the Scottish schools side. Fullarton turned professional with Edinburgh Reivers and has since played for Sale Sharks. He signed for Saracens in 2004. In June 2008 he signed a two-year deal to play for London Scottish.

== International career ==
Fullarton represented Scotland at under 21, under 19 and under 18 levels and made 15 appearances for the Scotland A side. He made his full Scotland debut in their tour of New Zealand in 2000, replacing Scott Murray in the first Test against New Zealand, and was subsequently selected in the starting line up for the second test. He won his third cap, again as a replacement for Scott Murray in the November 2001 Test, also against New Zealand. He won his fifth cap for Scotland when he came on as a substitute in the 2003 Rugby World Cup countdown Test against Ireland in 2003. Earlier that summer he toured South Africa with Scotland but did not play in either Test match. Overall he won eight international caps. In 2009 Fullarton represented the Barbarians.
