= David Milne (rugby union) =

Scotland international rugby union player (1958–2025)

- Born: David Ferguson Milne; 7 December 1958 Edinburgh, Scotland
- Died: 12 August 2025 (aged 66)
- Height: 5 ft 11.5 in (1.82 m)
- Weight: 102 kg (16 st 1 lb; 225 lb)
- Notable relative(s): Iain Milne, brother Kenny Milne, brother

Rugby union career
- Position: Prop
Amateur team(s)
Years	Team	Apps	(Points)
- Heriots
Provincial / State sides
Years	Team	Apps	(Points)
1986-	Edinburgh District		
International career
Years	Team	Apps	(Points)
1986-91	Scotland 'B'	6	(0)
1991	Scotland	1	(0)

David Milne (7 December 1958 – 12 August 2025) was a Scottish international rugby union player.

== Rugby union career ==
=== Amateur career ===
Milne also played for Heriot's Rugby Club. He formed a front row for Heriots with his brothers Iain Milne and Kenny Milne.

=== Provincial career ===
Milne played for the Anglo-Scots and also Edinburgh District.

=== International career ===
Milne was given six caps for Scotland 'B', the first being against France 'B' on 2 March 1986.

He was given a full senior cap once for Scotland in 1991. He was a replacement from the bench in Scotland's Autumn match against Japan.

== Personal life and death ==
His brothers Iain and Kenny were also capped for Scotland.

David Milne died from a long illness on 12 August 2025, at the age of 66.

== Sources ==
- Bath, Richard (ed.) The Scotland Rugby Miscellany (Vision Sports Publishing Ltd, 2007 ISBN 1-905326-24-6)
