= Eric Paxton =

Scotland international rugby union player

- Born: Robert Eric Paxton; 4 April 1957 (age 69)

Rugby union career
- Position: No. 8 / Flanker
Amateur team(s)
Years	Team	Apps	(Points)
-	Kelso		
1986	Co-Optimists		
Provincial / State sides
Years	Team	Apps	(Points)
-	South of Scotland District		
International career
Years	Team	Apps	(Points)
1981-82	Scotland 'B'	2	
1982	Scotland	2	(0)
Coaching career
- Years: Team
- 1996-97: Border Reivers
- 1997-: Biggar

Eric Paxton (born 4 April 1957) is a former Scotland national team international rugby union player.

== Rugby Union career ==
=== Amateur career ===
Paxton played for Kelso. He played for them in two championship winning sides.

He captained the Co-Optimists in 1986 when they played in the Hong Kong Sevens.

=== Provincial career ===
He played for South of Scotland District in the Scottish Inter-District Championship.

=== International career ===
He was capped by Scotland 'B' twice, the first time on 7 March 1981 against France 'B'. Scotland 'B' won the match 18-4. M

He was capped twice by the full senior Scotland side, both times in 1982. He played against Ireland at Lansdowne Rd, and Australia at the Sydney Cricket ground.

=== Coaching career ===
He was the head coach of the Border Reivers when the Scottish game turned professional in 1996.

He took over as head coach of Biggar in 1997.
