= Alex Moore (rugby union) =

Scotland international rugby union player

- Born: Alex Moore; 19 August 1963 (age 63) Ipswich, Queensland, Australia

Rugby union career
- Position: wing
Amateur team(s)
Years	Team	Apps	(Points)
- Livingston
–	Gala		
–	Edinburgh Academicals		
Provincial / State sides
Years	Team	Apps	(Points)
- South of Scotland District
-	Edinburgh District		
International career
Years	Team	Apps	(Points)
1986-89	Scotland 'B'	3	(0)
1990–91	Scotland	5	(8)

Alex Moore (born 19 August 1963) is a former Scotland international rugby union player. He won five caps playing on the wing.

== Rugby Union career ==
=== Amateur career ===
Moore was born in Ipswich, Queensland, Australia. He played at Livingston RFC for three seasons, followed by three seasons at Gala RFC. He played sevens too, helping Gala to lift the Jedforest trophy in 1985.

After this he joined Edinburgh Academicals.

=== Provincial career ===
While with Gala, he played for South of Scotland District.

On moving to Edinburgh Academicals he then played for Edinburgh District.

=== International career ===
Moore played for the Scotland 'B' side in 1986 and 1989. He was called up at short notice to the 1990 Scotland rugby union tour of New Zealand and performed well in early matches. His first international cap was against New Zealand at Auckland on 23 June 1990. The last of his five caps was against England at Twickenham on 16 February 1991.

He played three matches for Barbarians FC.
