= 1890–91 Scottish Districts season =

Rugby union competition

- Countries: Scotland
- Date: 1890–91
- Matches played: 1

The 1890–91 Scottish Districts season is a record of all the rugby union matches for Scotland's district teams.

== History ==
Glasgow District won the Inter-City match.

North of Scotland District arranged a number of matches this season.

Midlands District arranged a New Year fixture against Edinburgh Academicals.

== Results ==
Date	Try	Conversion	Penalty	Dropped goal	Goal from mark	Notes
1886–1891	1 point	2 points	3 points	3 points	—N/a	Scoring systems after the administration of the game was taken over by the IRFB now known as World Rugby

=== Inter-City ===
6 December 1890

Glasgow District	1 goal, 5 tries - 2 tries	Edinburgh District
Try: McEwan x 3 Orr x 2 Thompson; Con: Boswell	Report	Try: Smith; Stokes

Hamilton Crescent, Glasgow
Attendance: c. 2,500

Glasgow District:
Edinburgh District:

=== Other Scottish matches ===
8 December 1890

North of Scotland District	1 goal - 2 goals, 2 tries	Midlands District
	Report

University Ground, Aberdeen

North of Scotland District:
Midlands District:

13 December 1890

North of Scotland District	v	Glasgow District
	Preview

St. Andrews

North of Scotland District:
Glasgow District:

24 January 1891

East of Scotland District	1 try - 1 goal, 2 tries	West of Scotland District
	Preview; Report; Report

Raeburn Place, Edinburgh
Attendance: 4000

East of Scotland District:
West of Scotland District:

=== English matches ===
No other District matches played.

=== International matches ===
No touring matches this season.
