= Inverleith Sports Ground =

Rugby stadium

Coordinates: 55.9698°N 3.2201°W

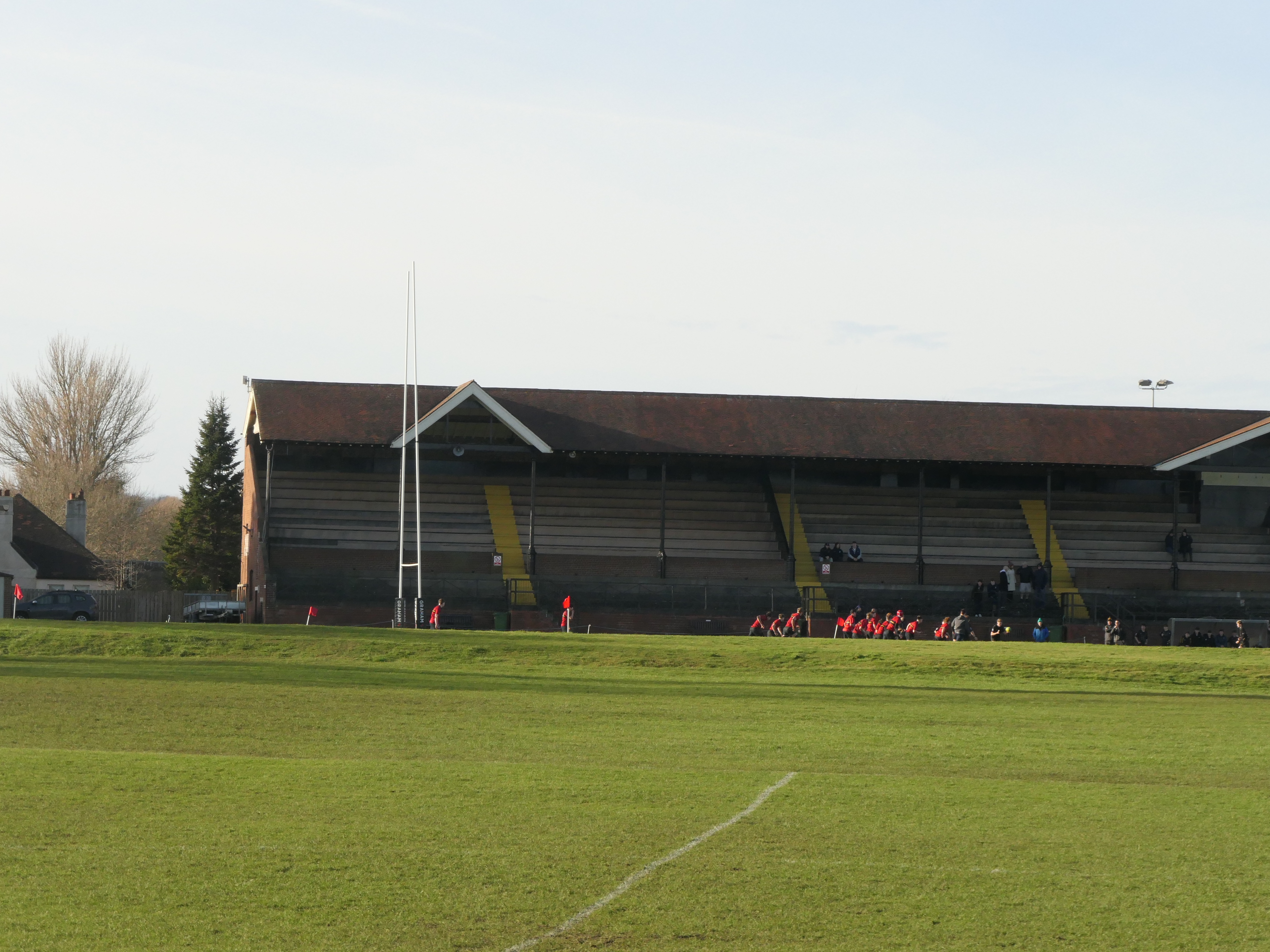
Inverleith in 2024, showing part of the main stand dating to the opening of the ground in 1899

The Inverleith Sports Ground is a rugby union stadium in Inverleith, Edinburgh, Scotland which is the home ground of amateur club Stewart's Melville RFC and was the home ground of the Scotland national rugby union team between 1899 and 1925.

== History ==
Land at Inverleith, at that time on the undeveloped northern fringe of Edinburgh, was purchased in 1897 by the Scottish Rugby Union (then the Scottish Football Union), which had previously played international matches at Raeburn Place about 1 kilometre (0.62 mi) further south towards the city centre; that was primarily a cricket venue (although it is still used for rugby today as the home of Edinburgh Accies). Thus the organisation became the first of the 'Home Unions' to have its own ground. The first match at the new ground was played on 18 February 1899 when Scotland were defeated 9–3 by Ireland in the 1899 Home Nations Championship.

International rugby was played at Inverleith until the early 1920s, including the first matches played at home by Scotland against New Zealand in 1905 and France in 1910. Having assessed the condition of the stadium following World War I (when only minimal maintenance was carried out) and the poor potential for expansion to cope with larger crowds as the sport's popularity grew, the SRU decided to move to a new site and transferred operations to Murrayfield Stadium on the west side of the city. The last international at the old ground was a victory over France in the 1925 Five Nations Championship; the subsequent win over England two months later that clinched the title and a first Grand Slam was the first match at the new ground.

Some further unofficial Scotland matches were played at Inverleith during World War II when Murrayfield was requisitioned for military use. The Scotland women's national rugby union team hosted matches there occasionally in the late 20th and early 21st centuries.

Club rugby was initially played at Inverleith by Stewart's College FP, the forerunner to the current Stewart's Melville RFC who still play there operating out of the 1990s clubhouse adjacent to the original grandstand – the owners, Stewart's Melville College, have their fields for other sports (such as Hockey and Cricket, as well as an impressive number of rugby pitches) in the surrounding area (they were formed by a merger of Daniel Stewart's College and Melville College, whose own sports grounds at Ferryfield, sold off for housing when the institutions merged, were immediately to the north).

== Location ==
The stadium is located on Ferry Road (A902); Edinburgh Academy's junior school is located a short distance to the east – much closer than Stewart's Melville College itself; Goldenacre, the home of another rival school club Heriot's, is around 1 kilometre (0.62 mi) further east.

The site is within the Inverleith conservation area. Local amateur rugby club Inverleith RFC do not play at the old stadium itself but on the Arboretum Road playing fields immediately to the east, while another local team, Edinburgh Northern RFC, use pitches in Inverleith Park.
