= Douglas Wyllie =

Scotland international rugby union player

- Born: Douglas Stewart Wylie; 20 May 1963 (age 63) Edinburgh, Scotland

Rugby union career
- Position: Centre
Amateur team(s)
Years	Team	Apps	(Points)
- Stewart's Melville
Provincial / State sides
Years	Team	Apps	(Points)
- Edinburgh District
1986	Combined Scottish Districts		
International career
Years	Team	Apps	(Points)
1984–85	Scotland 'B'	3	(0)
1984–94	Scotland	18	(3)
1990–93	Scotland 'A'	6	
Coaching career
- Years: Team
- 2001-: Kirkcaldy

Douglas Wylie (born 20 May 1963) is a former Scotland international rugby union player and now coach.

== Rugby Union career ==
=== Amateur career ===
Wylie was born in Edinburgh. He captained Stewart's Melville in 1994.

=== Provincial career ===
He played for Edinburgh District in the Scottish Inter-District Championship.

He played for Combined Scottish Districts on 1 March 1986 against South of Scotland.

=== International career ===
He was capped by Scotland 'B' three times in the seasons between 1984 and 1985.

He was capped by Scotland 'A' six times in the seasons between 1990 and 1993.

He had his full senior international debut, age 21, as fly-half against Australia at Murrayfield on 8 December 1984. He went on tour with Scotland on all but one of the ten that they made since 1984. Some tours, such as the 1988 Scotland rugby union tour of Zimbabwe didn't award full caps. His last international was against France on 19 March 1994.

He won 18 international caps.

=== Coaching career ===
He coached in New Zealand, then coached Kirkcaldy RFC in 2001.
