= 2000 Scotland rugby union tour of New Zealand =

Summary
P	W	D	L
Total
7	2	1	4
Test match
2	0	0	2
Opponent
P	W	D	L
New Zealand
2	0	0	2

The 2000 Scotland rugby union tour of New Zealand was a series of matches played in June–July 2000 in New Zealand by Scotland national rugby union team.

== Results ==
'Scores and results list Scotland's points tally first.

Opponent	For	Against	Date	Venue	Status
Vikings XV	16	42	9 June 2000	Whangārei	Tour match
East Coast & Poverty Bay	51	10	13 June 2000	Gisborne	Tour match
NZ Maori	15	18	17 June 2000	New Plymouth	Tour match
Nelson Bays	25	25	20 June 2000	Nelson	Tour match
New Zealand	20	69	24 June 2000	Carisbrook, Dunedin	Test match
Hawke's Bay	24	7	27 June 2000	Napier	Tour match
New Zealand	14	48	1 July 2000	Eden Park, Auckland	Test match
