= David Johnston (rugby union, born 1958) =

Scottish rugby union player

- Born: David Ian Johnston; 20 October 1958 (age 68) Edinburgh, Scotland

Rugby union career
Amateur team(s)
Years	Team	Apps	(Points)
- Watsonians RFC
International career
Years	Team	Apps	(Points)
1979-86	Scotland	27	(16)
Coaching career
- Years: Team
- 1988-98: Scotland (asst. coach)

David Ian Johnston (born 20 October 1958) is a Scottish former rugby union player. Johnston played 27 times at centre for the Scotland national rugby union team. He was formerly a commercial property partner in Burness Solicitors.

== Football ==
Johnston attended George Watson's College in Edinburgh and played rugby union, captaining the Scotland schoolboys team. He also played football, even though his school didn't have football teams. Johnston attracted the attention of football scouts with his performances for the Hutchison Vale boys club. He signed for Heart of Midlothian in 1977 and made one appearance in a First Division match against Dundee, but was substituted due to injury. He left Heart of Midlothian in 1978 and became a rugby player, while also studying for a law degree.

== Rugby ==
Johnston joined Watsonians RFC after ending his football career. He made his Scotland debut on 10 November 1979 against New Zealand at Murrayfield. Johnston was part of the Scotland team that won the Grand Slam in the 1984 Five Nations Championship and he scored a try in the win that year against England. His final appearance came on 29 March 1986, against Romania in Bucharest. His career record was: played 27, won 14, drew 2 and lost 11 and he scored 4 tries.

He took on the role of assistant coach for the 1988 Scotland rugby union tour of Zimbabwe, working with Richie Dixon. Dixon and Johnson were sacked by the SRU in 1998.
