= Watsonian FC =

Scottish rugby union club, based in Edinburgh

(Scotland) Watsonian
- Full name: Watsonian Football Club
- Union: SRU
- Founded: 1875; 151 years ago
- Location: Edinburgh, Scotland
- Ground: New Myreside (Capacity: 5,500)
- President: Richard Kelly
- Coach(es): Davey Wilson (Head Coach, Men's 1XV); Bruce Millar (Head Coach, Women's 1XV)
- Most caps: Mark Watters (348)
- League: Scottish Premiership
- 2025–26: Scottish Premiership, 4th of 10
Team kit

Official website
- watsoniansrugby.com

Watsonian Football Club is a rugby union club based in Edinburgh and part of the Scottish Rugby Union. It is one of a small number of rugby union clubs entitled to call itself a 'football club', rather than a 'rugby football club'. Watsonians run a number of sides; the top male side plays in the Scottish Premiership, the Women's side plays in the Scottish Women's Premiership (see Watsonians Ladies Rugby).

Between the 2019-2020 and 2023-2024 seasons the club ran a men's professional side which competed in the Super 6 league and Super Sprint competitions.

== History ==
The club is connected with George Watson's College as a club for former pupils, and changed its policy in the 1980s to be a fully open club, welcoming players of all abilities regardless of whether they attended the school or not.

The Watsonian Football Club played its first game on 30 January 1875 against St George that ended in a draw. Right from the beginning, the emphasis was on play combined with enjoying rugby football both on and off the field. With this aim, Watsonians has evolved and achieved many successes.

In 1876, Watsonians adopted the maroon & white colours it wears today and two years' later the Club moved to Myreside, named after a local farm. In 1877 the Club became a member of the Scottish Football Union (the SRU from 1924). Watsonians won their first Scottish Unofficial Championship in season 1891–92, but their greatest period of dominance came between 1908 and 1914 when they won the championship a further five times. The team of 1909–10 (pictured right) was undefeated against Scottish opposition during that season.

On 4 March 1933, Watsonians opened their current home at New Myreside with a victory over Royal High School FP. The Championship arrived at the new home in two of the next three seasons, but the club had to wait 33 years for the next success in season 1969–70.

In season 1973–74, the National League was introduced and Watsonians were placed in Division 1, a position the club has maintained for 24 of the 26 seasons played.

The Club relaxed their membership rules after relegation in 1989 and returned to the top level by going undefeated to win the Division II championship in 1990–91. Since their return to Division 1 Watsonians has regularly challenged for honours before regaining that elusive Scottish Championship again in season 1997–98.

== Squads ==
Watsonians has four male squads and one ladies team who play in the following leagues:

- 1st XV - Arnold Clark Men's Premiership
- 2nd XV – Reserve League National 1
- 3rd XV – Reserve League East 2
- Ladies XV – Women's Premiership

1st XV – coached by Jason Riley 2nd XV – coached by Sam Rowlands. 3rd XV – coached by Johnny Sandlan.

Club Captain – Emily Cotterill. Vice Captain - Jamie Hodgson. Vice Captain - Rory Hutton.

=== 1st XV Team ===
The 1st XV team enjoyed a successful 2005–06 season, winning the BT Cup and finishing second in the Scottish Premiership, Division 1. In 2012–13 season the club narrowly failed to return to the Premiership, finishing 3rd in the National League. The coaching team is led by ex-Scotland player Marcus Di Rollo.

=== Ladies's Section ===
Watsonians also has a women's team which play in the Premiership of the Scottish Rugby's Women's League. The ladies section was formed in 2001 by a number of players from different clubs around the city.

The team are a 40 squad of female athletes and in the 2019/20 season are competing in the Scottish Women's Premier League for the third year in a row. They have achieved increasing success over the last few years, culminating in finishing second in the league and going on to play and win the National Sarah Beaney Cup Final on the main pitch at BT Murrayfield stadium in April 2019. This match formed part of the well-attended Scottish Rugby Silver Saturday showpiece event and represented the highest level of women's club rugby in the country; furthermore, this final was the first Scottish women's club game to be streamed live on BBC Alba.

The team is coached by Freddie Main, supported by Scott Nightingale, Lucy Brown and Duncan Wilson and is currently captained by Rachel Bragg.

== Notable former players ==
Watsonian's first Scotland cap was John Tod in 1884. Since then Watsonians has fielded no fewer than 62 Scottish internationalists, including five Scotland captains and seven British and Irish Lions. Watsonians have had key roles in all of Scotland's three Grand Slams to date.

In 1925 Watsonians forward Sandy Gillies played in three international matches and against France he scored one try and kicked two conversions and against England he converted a try with a superb kick from the touch line to help seal the victory in this game. James Ritchie represented Scotland in the six international matches of 1933 (Triple Crown) and 1934.

Against England in 1984, centres David Johnston and Euan Kennedy scored both Scotland's tries en route to Scotland's first Grand Slam since 1925.

Gavin and Scott Hastings played in every game of Scotland's successful Grand Slam season of 1990. In the never to be forgotten final game against England, Gavin's kick through set up the deciding try for Tony Stanger and Scott made an outstanding try saving tackle on Rory Underwood. Gavin went on to captain Scotland and the 1993 British Lions and until recently, Scott was Scotland's most capped player.

== List of Watsonian Men's Scotland Caps ==
- Alex Angus, 18 caps. also played for Scotland national cricket team.
- David Bertram, 11 caps.
- Jimmy Carmichael
- John Dallas
- David Deas
- Marcus Di Rollo 21 caps
- Robert Dryden
- Robert Finlay
- Sandy Gillies, 12 caps.
- Stuart Grimes
- Stanley Harper
- Gavin Hastings British & Irish Lions
- Scott Hastings British & Irish Lions
- David Johnston
- RF Kelly British & Irish Lions
- Euan Kennedy
- Iain Lambie
- Herbert Leggatt
- Ian Lumsden
- John MacCallum, 26 caps.
- Grant McKelvey
- Eric Milroy, 12 caps.
- Norman Munnoch
- JM Ritchie.
- George Roberts
- Alec Robertson
- Graham Ross
- Donald Scott
- John Simson
- Harry Smith, 11 caps
- Tom Smith
- Louis Moritz Speirs
- John Tod
- Kyle Traynor, 3 caps.
- Jason White British & Irish Lions
- Hugh Wright
- John Howard Wilson
- Kenneth Wilson
- Robert Young

== Scotland 7s Internationalist Section ==
- Jack Ferguson
- Andrew Skeen
- Michael Fedo
- Stuart McInally
- Jamie Blackwood
- Craig Sorbie
- Nick Penny
- Megan Gaffney
- Bryony Nelson
- Hannah Smith
- Lana Skeldon
- Andrew Turnbull

== Honours ==
- Scottish Unofficial Championship
  - Champions (8 + 7 shared): 1891–92 (with West of Scotland), 1892–93, 1893–94, 1894–95 (with West of Scotland), 1896–97 (with Clydesdale and Jed-Forest), 1901–02 (with Edinburgh University), 1908–09 (with Hawick), 1909–10, 1910–11, 1911–12 (with Edinburgh University), 1913–14, 1920–21, 1934–35, 1936–37 (with Hillhead HSFP), 1969–70
- Scottish Premiership
  - Champions: 1997–98
- Scottish League Championship, second tier
  - Champions (3): 1990–91, 2002–03, 2015–16
- Scottish Cup
  - Champions: 2005–06
  - Runners-Up (2): 1995–96, 2002–03

=== Sevens ===
- Melrose Sevens
  - Champions (11): 1905, 1906, 1907, 1914, 1926, 1935, 1936, 1945, 1976, 1996, 2018
- Langholm Sevens
  - Champions (3): 2016, 2018, 2019
- Hawick Sevens
  - Champions (4): 1906, 1950, 2004, 2018
- Gala Sevens
  - Champions (7): 1905, 1996, 1997, 2003, 2005, 2016, 2017
- Berwick Sevens
  - Champions (5): 2007, 2009, 2013, 2018, 2019
- Jed-Forest Sevens
  - Champions (8): 1905, 1906, 1956, 1963, 2002, 2004, 2008, 2017
- Peebles Sevens
  - Champions (13): 1936, 1937, 1939, 1952, 1955, 1956, 1972, 1999, 2005, 2007, 2008, 2012, 2017
- Earlston Sevens
  - Champions (4): 2005, 2008, 2009, 2019
- FOSROC Super 6
  - Champions: 2022
- FOSROC Super 6 Sprint Series
  - Champions: 2022
- Kelso Sevens
  - Champions (4): 2012, 2013, 2017, 2019
- Kings of the Sevens
  - Champions (4): 2009, 2017, 2018, 2019
- Walkerburn Sevens
  - Champions (4): 1939, 1940, 1941, 1959
- Morningside Sevens
  - Champions: 1903
- Edinburgh Northern Sevens
  - Champions (3): 2000, 2017, 2018
