= Kenny Milne (rugby union) =

British Lions & Scotland international rugby union player

- Born: Kenny Milne; 1 December 1961 (age 64) Edinburgh, Scotland

Rugby union career
- Position: Hooker
Amateur team(s)
Years	Team	Apps	(Points)
- Heriots
Provincial / State sides
Years	Team	Apps	(Points)
- Edinburgh District
International career
Years	Team	Apps	(Points)
1985-89	Scotland 'B'	6	(0)
1989−95	Scotland	39	(12)
1993	British & Irish Lions	1	(0)

Kenny Milne (born 1 December 1961 in Edinburgh, Scotland) is a former Scotland international rugby union player who was capped 39 times. He was also a British & Irish Lion, touring in 1993.

== Rugby Union career ==
=== Amateur career ===
Educated at George Heriot's School in Edinburgh, he played hooker; and went on to play for Heriots.

Milne recalls:

The game that saw Heriot’s fight off relegation and retain its First Division status in 1993, after an improbable victory against champions Melrose, probably ranks higher in terms of my most memorable matches than any game I played for Scotland or the Lions.

=== Provincial career ===
He was capped by Edinburgh District. He was part of the team that won the 1986–87 Scottish Inter-District Championship.

Milne recalled how his rugby playing brothers helped each other in these inter-district matches:

On the rugby field, Edinburgh vs Glasgow when George Graham was vying for honours at the same time as David, Iain absolutely destroyed George to help David’s cause.

=== International career ===
He won 6 caps for Scotland 'B', the first coming against Italy 'B' on 7 December 1985.

He was part of the Grand Slam winning side in 1990. He made his Scotland debut 21 January 1989 against Wales alongside his brother, Iain Milne who was representing his country for the 42nd time as prop. Kenny's final appearance came during the 1995 Rugby World Cup in South Africa against New Zealand. In all he won 39 caps and scored 3 tries. Milne was known for his workrate, durability, hard tackling and courage. He went on one British and Irish Lions tour to New Zealand in 1993 playing in the first test v New Zealand.

== Business career ==
He runs a printing company.

== Family ==
He is the brother of Iain, and David Milne.
