= Scott Hastings (rugby union) =

Scotland and Lions rugby union player (1964–2026)

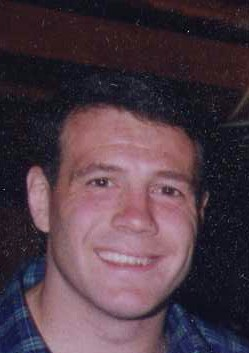
- Hastings in 1996
- Born: 4 December 1964 Edinburgh, Scotland
- Died: 17 May 2026 (aged 61) Edinburgh, Scotland
- Height: 1.85 m (6 ft 1 in)
- Weight: 91 kg (14 st 5 lb; 201 lb)
- School: George Watson's College
- Notable relative(s): Adam Hastings (nephew); Gavin Hastings (brother)

Rugby union career
- Position: Outside centre
Amateur team(s)
Years	Team	Apps	(Points)
1980–2000	Watsonians	226	(500)
Senior career
Years	Team	Apps	(Points)
1996–1999	Edinburgh		
Provincial / State sides
Years	Team	Apps	(Points)
1985–1996	Edinburgh District		
1986	Combined Scottish Districts		
1996	Cities District		
International career
Years	Team	Apps	(Points)
- Scotland Schools
1985	Scotland 'B'	1	(0)
1986–1997	Scotland	65	(43)
1986–2000	Barbarians	13	
1989, 1993	British Lions	2	(0)

Scott Hastings (4 December 1964 – 17 May 2026) was a Scottish and British and Irish Lions rugby union player and sports summariser. He gained 65 full international caps between 1986 and 1997 and at his retirement he was Scotland's most-capped player ever. He went on two British Lions tours. He played for Edinburgh District and, when that provincial side turned professional, for Edinburgh Rugby. He maintained a strong connection with Watsonians who he first played for at an amateur level and then at the start of the professional era, eventually being their director of rugby.

== Rugby union career ==
=== Amateur career ===
Hastings played for Watsonians, making his senior debut in 1982. While with Watsonians, they won the Scottish Premiership in the 1997–98 season; and the Melrose Sevens in 1996.

=== Provincial and professional career ===
In 1983, while at Newcastle Polytechnic, Hastings played for the Anglo-Scots. He then played for Edinburgh District. While with the district side, they won the Scottish Inter-District Championship for 3 successive seasons: 1986–87, 1987–88 and 1988–89.

He played for Combined Scottish Districts on 1 March 1986 against South of Scotland.

Hastings played for and captained the Cities District side in their match against Australia on 3 November 1996.

When Scotland adopted the professional rugby union model in 1996, Hastings went on to play for and captain Edinburgh Rugby. He guided Edinburgh Rugby to win the 1997–98 and 1998–99 Inter-District Championships. He retired from professional rugby in January 1999.

=== International career ===
Hastings played full back for Scotland Schools and for Scotland 'B' against Italy 'B' on 7 December 1985. He gained his first full senior cap on 18 January 1986 at Murrayfield against France, with his brother Gavin also gaining his first full cap. They were the first brothers to make their full international debuts on the same day that century. He then won 65 full senior caps at centre for Scotland from 1986 to 1997.

Injury caused him to withdraw from the 1988 tour of Zimbabwe.

Although perhaps overshadowed by his brother Gavin, Scott Hastings is himself one of the greatest players in Scottish rugby history.

He first entered the Scottish squad set-up in 1986 as one of the most cocksure personalities they had ever met. And while that wild joie de vivre and natural ebullience has sometimes since overspilled off the pitch, they have been a positive boon. In his early days, Scott was most notable for his searing pace, straight-running and ability to break the gain line virtually every time he received the ball. It was not long, however, before his bullocking runs from the centre were complemented by the stonewall defensive qualities which were to remain the salient quality in his game as his pace faded later on.

And

If there is one moment for which he will long be remembered, it was during the 1990 Grand Slam decider, the proudest day in Scottish rugby history. English winger Rory Underwood had scythed through the Scottish defence when Hastings managed to drag him down short of the line when a try seemed inevitable.

In June 1996, Hastings made his 62nd Scotland full international appearance and became for a time the country's most capped rugby player, surpassing his brother Gavin.

Hastings was twice a member of the British Lions: in 1989 (Australia) and 1993 (New Zealand). On the latter tour, a cheekbone injury kept him out of the test matches. He and Gavin became the first set of brothers to play together on two Lions tours.

He played in 13 matches for the Barbarians, between 1986 and 2000, captaining the side against New Zealand in December 1993.

In October 2025, he was inducted into Scottish Rugby's hall of fame.

== Media career ==
Hastings appeared as a guest presenter on STV's daily lifestyle show The Hour on a few occasions – his first show being in November 2009, alongside main anchor Michelle McManus.

He was a co-commentator for ITV's coverage of the 2011 Rugby World Cup. On 10 July 2014, he made his debut on the BBC's political discussion show Question Time. During the 2014 Scottish independence referendum, Hastings supported the Better Together, the successful campaign against the independence.

Hastings was part of the ITV team covering the 2019 Rugby World Cup.

== Charity work ==
In 2016 he and his wife Jenny were announced as ambassadors for mental health charity Support in Mind Scotland.

Hastings was a patron of MND Scotland. He was a supporter of the Euan MacDonald Centre, a research centre that looks at motor neurone disease and is part of the University of Edinburgh.

== Personal life and death ==
Hastings was the younger brother of Gavin Hastings, also a Lions and Scotland international rugby union player.

Hastings's daughter was selected to play hockey for Scotland in 2019.

In May 2022, he spoke about his diagnosis of non-Hodgkin lymphoma and that he had received chemotherapy as treatment for this. Later that year he described that he had received his cancer diagnosis five years previously, and was then in remission.

In September 2024, his wife, Jenny, died by suicide at a location used for wild swimming in the Firth of Forth.

Hastings died from non-Hodgkin lymphoma on 17 May 2026, aged 61. A private ceremony was held at George Watson's College on 27 June 2026.

On 18 July 2026, Scottish Rugby paid a tribute to Hastings at the Nations Championship match at Murrayfield against Fiji with Ollie Smith wearing a special version of the 13 shirt.
