= Iain Milne =

British Lions & Scotland international rugby union player

- Born: Iain Gordon Milne; 17 June 1956 (age 70)
- Height: 1.83 m (6 ft 0 in)
- Weight: 112 kg (247 lb)
- Notable relative(s): David Milne (brother); Kenny Milne (brother)

Rugby union career
- Position: Prop
Amateur team(s)
Years	Team	Apps	(Points)
- Heriots
- Harlequins
Senior career
Years	Team	Apps	(Points)
- Edinburgh District
International career
Years	Team	Apps	(Points)
1979–90	Scotland	44	(0)
1983	British & Irish Lions	8	(4)

Iain Gordon Milne (born 17 June 1956 in Edinburgh, Scotland) is a former Scotland international rugby union player and British & Irish Lion.

== Rugby union career ==
=== Amateur career ===
Educated at George Heriot's School in Edinburgh, he played prop and Milne later played for Heriot's FP and also the English side, Harlequin F.C. His nickname is "The Bear" in view of his physical size and strength.

=== Provincial career ===
He played for Edinburgh District; and was part of the 1986–87 Scottish Inter-District Championship winning side.

=== International career ===
He was part of the Grand Slam winning side in 1984. He made his Scotland debut 3 March 1979 against Ireland. His 42nd, and last, cap was won alongside his brother, Kenny who was representing his country for the first time as hooker. Iain's final appearance came during the 1990 tour of New Zealand although he did not participate in the Scotland's 1990 Grand Slam. In all he won 44 caps. Milne was known for his workrate, durability, hard tackling and courage.

Richard Bath writes of him that, he was

"one of the great anomalies of Scottish forward play, a lumbering bull of a man whose greatest strength lay in his sheer strength. Although a capable footballer, it was Milne's destiny to build up a reputation as a formidable scrummager; the type of man even the Paparembordes of the world thought twice about taking issue with. But then, as Milne himself says, it was his ability to provide a solid tight platform that would allow Scotland to play No. 8s such as Derek White and Iain Paxton in the second row so that they could play a more fluid style and get away with it."

=== Administrative career ===
In 2012, Milne took up the position of Vice President at Heriot's Rugby Club.

== Family ==
His brothers David and Kenny were also capped by Scotland. Known as "the Three Bears", the Milne brothers made one appearance together as the Barbarians front row.
