= List of Scotland B national rugby union players =

List of Scotland 'B' international players is a list of people who have played for Scotland 'B'.

Scotland 'B' international matches took place between 1971 and 1992. The name of the Anglo-Scots district side is used here as it was commonly used at that time period; they changed their name in 1992 to be known as the Scottish Exiles side to better reflect the Scottish diaspora.

Players in BOLD font have been capped by Scotland.

Players in Italic font have capped either by the Scotland international 7s side; or by the Scotland international XV 'A' side.

A position in parentheses indicates that the player debuted as a substitute.

Amateur Era. (1871–1996) Capped at District level:

**South of Scotland**	**Glasgow District**	**North and Midlands**	**Edinburgh District**	**Anglo-Scots**	**Other Districts**	**No District caps**

== 1970s ==
Number	Name	Position	Club 1	Club 2	District 1	District 2	Date of 'B' Debut	Debut Opposition	No. of 'B' caps
B1	**Hamish Bryce**	Prop	Bristol RFC	London Scottish	Anglo-Scots		1971-11-13	France 'B'	2
B2	**Bobby Clark**	Hooker	Edinburgh Wanderers		Edinburgh District		1971-11-13	France 'B'	1
B3	John Steven	Prop	Edinburgh Wanderers		Edinburgh District		1971-11-13	France 'B'	1
B4	J. S. Wilkinson	Lock	Boroughmuir		Edinburgh District		1971-11-13	France 'B'	2
B5	**Ian Barnes**	Lock	Hawick		South of Scotland		1971-11-13	France 'B'	1
B6	Hamish Howie	Flanker	Glasgow HSFP	London Scottish	Glasgow District	Anglo-Scots	1971-11-13	France 'B'	2
B7	**Bill Watson**	Flanker	Boroughmuir		Edinburgh District	Cities District	1971-11-13	France 'B'	1
B8	Sid Fowler	No. 8	Dunfermline		North and Midlands		1971-11-13	France 'B'	2
B9	**Dougie Morgan**	Scrum half	Melville College FP	Stewart's Melville	Edinburgh District	Cities District	1971-11-13	France 'B'	1
B10	Ally Black	Fly Half	Boroughmuir		Edinburgh District		1971-11-13	France 'B'	1
B11	**David Shedden**	Wing	West of Scotland		Glasgow District		1971-11-13	France 'B'	2
B12	**Jim Renwick**	Centre	Hawick		South of Scotland	Provinces District	1971-11-13	France 'B'	2
B13	**Michael Hunter**	Centre	Glasgow HSFP		Glasgow District	Cities District	1971-11-13	France 'B'	2
B14	**Lewis Dick**	Wing	Loughborough Students	Jordanhill	Glasgow District	Anglo-Scots	1971-11-13	France 'B'	1
B15	Niven Rose	Full back	Dalry HSFP	Kilmarnock	Glasgow District		1971-11-13	France 'B'	2
B16	J. A. Hardie	Hooker	Aberdeen GSFP		North and Midlands		1972-11-11	France 'B'	2
B17	Struan McCallum	Prop	Jordanhill		Glasgow District	Cities District	1972-11-11	France 'B'	2
B18	**Ronald Wright**	Lock	Edinburgh Wanderers		Edinburgh District	Cities District	1972-11-11	France 'B'	1
B19	R. S. Tolbert	Lock	Watsonians		Edinburgh District	Cities District	1972-11-11	France 'B'	1
B20	**Bob Haldane**	Flanker	West of Scotland		Glasgow District		1972-11-11	France 'B'	2
B21	Ally Fraser	Flanker	Edinburgh Wanderers		Edinburgh District	Cities District	1972-11-11	France 'B'	1
B22	Fraser Dall	Fly Half	Heriot's		Edinburgh District	Cities District	1972-11-11	France 'B'	1
B23	**Alastair Cranston**	Centre	Hawick		South of Scotland		1972-11-11	France 'B'	2
B24	**Drew Gill**	Wing	Gala		South of Scotland		1972-11-11	France 'B'	2
B25	**Andy Irvine**	Full back	Heriot's		Edinburgh District	Cities District	1972-11-11	France 'B'	1
B26	A. C. Wilson	Prop	West of Scotland		Glasgow District	Cities District	1974-02-17	France 'B'	2
B27	Rodney Balfour	Hooker	Glasgow HSFP		Glasgow District	Cities District	1974-02-17	France 'B'	2
B28	**George Mackie**	Lock	Highland		North and Midlands		1974-02-17	France 'B'	2
B29	Wes Wyroslawski	Lock	Jordanhill		Glasgow District		1974-02-17	France 'B'	2*
B30	Ross Mackenzie	Flanker	London Scottish		Anglo-Scots		1974-02-17	France 'B'	6
B31	**David Leslie**	Flanker	Dundee HSFP		North and Midlands		1974-02-17	France 'B'	2
B32	**Hugh McHardy**	Scrum half	Kilmarnock		Glasgow District		1974-02-17	France 'B'	2
B33	**David Bell**	Fly Half	London Scottish	Watsonians	Edinburgh District		1974-02-17	France 'B'	2
B34	K. G. Morrison	Wing	Glasgow HSFP		Glasgow District		1974-02-17	France 'B'	2
B35	**George Turnbull**	Centre	Jed-Forest		South of Scotland		1974-02-17	France 'B'	2
B36	**Bruce White**	Wing	Hawick		South of Scotland		1974-02-17	France 'B'	2
B37	David Aitchison	Full back	Jordanhill	Highland	North and Midlands		1974-02-17	France 'B'	4
B38	**Jim Aitken**	Prop	Gala		South of Scotland		1975-01-18	France 'B'	2
B39	**Norman Pender**	Prop	Hawick		South of Scotland		1975-01-18	France 'B'	2
B40	**Alan Tomes**	Lock	Hawick		South of Scotland		1975-01-18	France 'B'	2
B41	Ian Gray	Lock	West of Scotland	London Scottish	Glasgow District		1975-01-18	France 'B'	2
B42	**Mike Biggar**	No. 8	London Scottish		Anglo-Scots		1975-01-18	France 'B'	1
B43	**Roy Laidlaw**	Scrum half	Jed-Forest		South of Scotland		1975-01-18	France 'B'	2
B44	**Ron Wilson**	Fly Half	London Scottish		Anglo-Scots		1975-01-18	France 'B'	1
B45	**Alan Friell**	Centre	London Scottish		Anglo-Scots		1975-01-18	France 'B'	6
B46	Tim Dunlop	Wing	West of Scotland	Dunfermline	Glasgow District	North and Midlands	1975-01-18	France 'B'	2
B47	**Colin Deans**	Hooker	Hawick		South of Scotland		1976-03-07	France 'B'	3
B48	**Iain Lambie**	Lock	Watsonians		Edinburgh District		1976-03-07	France 'B'	1
B49	**George Watson**	Lock	Boroughmuir		Edinburgh District		1976-03-07	France 'B'	1
B50	**Wat Davies**	Flanker	Hawick		South of Scotland		1976-03-07	France 'B'	1
B51	A. J. Preston	Flanker	Gosforth	London Scottish	Anglo-Scots		1976-03-07	France 'B'	6
B52	**Donald MacDonald**	No. 8	Oxford University	London Scottish	Anglo-Scots		1976-03-07	France 'B'	2
B53	**Richard Breakey**	Fly Half	Gosforth		Anglo-Scots		1976-03-07	France 'B'	2
B54	E. J. Livingston	Wing	West of Scotland		Glasgow District		1976-03-07	France 'B'	2
B55	A. R. Grant	Wing	London Scottish		Anglo-Scots		1976-03-07	France 'B'	1
B56	**Euan Kennedy**	Full back	Watsonians		Edinburgh District		1976-03-07	France 'B'	2
B57	**Gerry McGuinness**	Prop	West of Scotland		Glasgow District		1977-02-05	France 'B'	2
B58	Doug Smith	Lock	Glasgow HSFP		Glasgow District		1977-02-05	France 'B'	2
B59	**Brian Hegarty**	Flanker	Hawick		South of Scotland		1977-02-05	France 'B'	2
B60	**Gordon Dickson**	Flanker	Gala		South of Scotland		1977-02-05	France 'B'	3
B61	R. Hall	No. 8	Watsonians		Edinburgh District		1977-02-05	France 'B'	1
B62	Duncan Wilson	Fly Half	Boroughmuir		Edinburgh District		1977-02-05	France 'B'	1
B63	**David Ashton**	Wing	Ayr		Glasgow District		1977-02-05	France 'B'	1
B64	Harry Burnett	Centre	Heriot's		Edinburgh District		1977-02-05	France 'B'	3
B65	**Bill Gammell**	Wing	Edinburgh Wanderers		Edinburgh District		1977-02-05	France 'B'	2*
B66	**James Burnett**	Prop	Heriot's		Edinburgh District		1977-12-03	Ireland 'B'	3
B67	Hugh Campbell	Prop	Jordanhill		Glasgow District		1977-12-03	Ireland 'B'	2
B68	**David Gray**	Lock	West of Scotland		Glasgow District		1977-12-03	Ireland 'B'	2
B69	Angus Stewart	Flanker	London Scottish		Anglo-Scots		1977-12-03	Ireland 'B'	1
B70	Donald McLeod	No. 8	Hawick		South of Scotland		1977-12-03	Ireland 'B'	2
B71	**John Rutherford**	Fly Half	Selkirk		South of Scotland		1977-12-03	Ireland 'B'	2
B72	Andy Blackwood	Wing	Stewart's Melville		Edinburgh District		1977-12-03	Ireland 'B'	1
B73	**Colin Mair**	Full back	West of Scotland		Glasgow District		1977-12-03	Ireland 'B'	2
B74	**Kenneth Lawrie**	Hooker	Gala		South of Scotland		1978-03-19	France 'B'	3
B75	**Norrie Rowan**	Prop	Forrester	Boroughmuir	Edinburgh District		1978-03-19	France 'B'	3
B76	**Richie Dixon**	Flanker	Jordanhill		Glasgow District	Cities District	1978-03-19	France 'B'	3
B77	Brian Halliday	Wing	Boroughmuir		Edinburgh District		1978-03-19	France 'B'	1
B78	**Andy Dougall**	Centre	Jordanhill		Glasgow District		1978-03-19	France 'B'	1
B79	**Keith Robertson**	Wing	Melrose		South of Scotland		1978-03-19	France 'B'	1
B80	John Brown	Full back	Ayr		Glasgow District		1978-03-19	France 'B'	1
B81	**Bill Cuthbertson**	Lock	Kilmarnock	Harlequins	Glasgow District		1979-12-01	Ireland 'B'	2
B82	Andy Dunlop	Lock	Highland		North and Midlands		1979-12-01	Ireland 'B'	2
B83	**Jim Calder**	Flanker	Stewart's Melville		Edinburgh District	Combined Scottish Districts	1979-12-01	Ireland 'B'	2
B84	**John Beattie**	Flanker	Glasgow Academicals	Heriots	Glasgow District		1979-12-01	Ireland 'B'	2
B85	**Bryan Gossman**	Fly half	Ardrossan Academicals	West of Scotland	Glasgow District		1979-12-01	Ireland 'B'	2
B86	**Roger Baird**	Wing	Kelso		South of Scotland		1979-12-01	Ireland 'B'	3
B87	**Jimmy Gossman**	Centre	West of Scotland		Glasgow District		1979-12-01	Ireland 'B'	2
B88	**Steve Munro**	Wing	Ayr	West of Scotland	Glasgow District	Combined Scottish Districts	1979-12-01	Ireland 'B'	2
B89	**Peter Dods**	Full back	Gala		South of Scotland		1979-12-01	Ireland 'B'	4

== 1980s ==
B90	Rob Cunningham	Hooker	Gosforth	Bath	Anglo-Scots		1981-03-07	France 'B'	6
B91	John Fraser	Prop	London Scottish		Anglo-Scots		1981-03-07	France 'B'	5
B92	Ian McKie	Lock	Sale		Anglo-Scots		1981-03-07	France 'B'	4
B93	**Tom Smith**	Lock	Gala		South of Scotland		1981-03-07	France 'B'	2
B94	Jock Berthinussen	Flanker	Gala		South of Scotland		1981-03-07	France 'B'	1
B95	Peter Lillington	Flanker	Durham University	Harlequins	Anglo-Scots		1981-03-07	France 'B'	2
B96	**Eric Paxton**	No. 8	Kelso		South of Scotland		1981-03-07	France 'B'	2
B97	**Gordon Hunter**	Scrum half	Selkirk		South of Scotland	Combined Scottish Districts	1981-03-07	France 'B'	4
B98	Alan Armstrong	Wing	Jordanhill	Stirling County	Glasgow District		1981-03-07	France 'B'	2
B99	**Gary Callander**	Hooker	Kelso		South of Scotland	Combined Scottish Districts	1982-02-07	France 'B'	1
B100	**Derek Turnbull**	Lock	Hawick		South of Scotland		1982-02-07	France 'B'	6
B101	**Derek White**	Flanker	Gala		South of Scotland		1982-02-07	France 'B'	1
B102	Dave Bryson	Scrum half	Gala		South of Scotland		1982-02-07	France 'B'	3
B103	**Iwan Tukalo**	Wing	Royal HSFP	Selkirk	Edinburgh District	South of Scotland	1982-02-07	France 'B'	5
B104	John Hume	Centre	London Scottish		Anglo-Scots		1982-02-07	France 'B'	2
B105	**Rick Gordon**	Centre	London Scottish		Anglo-Scots		1982-02-07	France 'B'	1
B106	Dave Cockburn	Prop	Boroughmuir		Edinburgh District		1983-03-19	France 'B'	1
B107	**Alister Campbell**	Lock	Hawick		South of Scotland		1983-03-19	France 'B'	3
B108	Glen Millar	Lock	Heriot's		Edinburgh District	Combined Scottish Districts	1983-03-19	France 'B'	1
B109	**John Jeffrey**	Flanker	Kelso		South of Scotland		1983-03-19	France 'B'	3
B110	John Calder	Flanker	Stewart's Melville		Edinburgh District	Combined Scottish Districts	1983-03-19	France 'B'	1
B111	Donald Flockhart	No. 8	Highland		North and Midlands		1983-03-19	France 'B'	1
B112	Colin Gass	Fly Half	Hawick		South of Scotland		1983-03-19	France 'B'	2
B113	Peter Hewitt	Wing	Heriots		Edinburgh District		1983-03-19	France 'B'	1
B114	Craig Williamson	Centre	West of Scotland		Glasgow District		1983-03-19	France 'B'	2
B115	**Peter Steven**	Wing	Heriot's		Edinburgh District	Combined Scottish Districts	1983-03-19	France 'B'	4
B116	**Gavin Hastings**	Full back	Watsonians		Edinburgh District	Anglo-Scots	1983-03-19	France 'B'	5
B117	**David Sole**	Prop	Bath	Edinburgh Academicals	Anglo-Scots	Edinburgh District	1983-12-03	Ireland 'B'	5
B118	**Finlay Calder**	Flanker	Stewart's Melville		Edinburgh District	Combined Scottish Districts	1983-12-03	Ireland 'B'	2
B119	Billy Murray	No. 8	Hawick		South of Scotland		1983-12-03	Ireland 'B'	3
B120	**Douglas Wyllie**	Fly Half	Stewart's Melville		Edinburgh District	Combined Scottish Districts	1983-12-03	Ireland 'B'	3
B121	Duncan Bruce Lockhart	Centre	London Scottish		Anglo-Scots		1983-12-03	Ireland 'B'	2
B122	**Sean McGaughey**	Flanker	Hawick		South of Scotland		1984-02-19	France 'B'	1
B123	**Stewart McAslan**	Centre	Heriot's	Glasgow Academicals	Edinburgh District	Glasgow District	1984-02-19	France 'B'	5
B124	Paul Hogarth	Flanker	Hawick		South of Scotland		1984-12-01	Ireland 'B'	6
B125	Charlie Richardson	Flanker	Edinburgh Academicals	London Scottish	Edinburgh District		1984-12-01	Ireland 'B'	4
B126	**Stuart Johnston**	Scrum half	Watsonians		Edinburgh District		1984-12-01	Ireland 'B'	4
B127	**Keith Murray**	Centre	Hawick		South of Scotland		1984-12-01	Ireland 'B'	2
B128	**Alan Tait**	Centre	Kelso		South of Scotland		1984-12-01	Ireland 'B'	6
B129	Ronnie Nichol	Prop	Hawick		South of Scotland		1985-01-19	France 'B'	1
B130	**Jeremy Campbell-Lamerton**	Lock	London Scottish		Anglo-Scots		1985-01-19	France 'B'	2
B131	**Jerry Macklin**	Flanker	London Scottish		Anglo-Scots		1985-01-19	France 'B'	7
B132	**Hugh Parker**	No. 8	Kilmarnock	Wigtownshire	Glasgow District		1985-01-19	France 'B'	6
B133	**Matt Duncan**	Wing	West of Scotland		Glasgow District		1985-01-19	France 'B'	2
B134	**Kenny Milne**	Hooker	Heriot's		Edinburgh District		1985-12-07	Italy 'B'	6
B135	**Gary Waite**	Prop	Kelso		South of Scotland		1985-12-07	Italy 'B'	4
B136	**Richard Cramb**	Fly Half	Harlequins	London Scottish	Anglo-Scots		1985-12-07	Italy 'B'	2
B137	Simon Scott	Centre	Stewart's Melville		Edinburgh District		1985-12-07	Italy 'B'	4
B138	**Scott Hastings**	Full back	Watsonians		Edinburgh District	Cities District	1985-12-07	Italy 'B'	1
B139	**David Milne**	Prop	Heriot's		Edinburgh District		1986-03-02	France 'B'	6
B140	George Runciman	Hooker	Melrose		South of Scotland		1986-03-02	France 'B'	1
B141	Stewart Hamilton	Lock	Heriots	Stirling County	Edinburgh District	Glasgow District	1986-03-02	France 'B'	2
B142	Sandy Thomson	Wing	Kelso		South of Scotland		1986-03-02	France 'B'	1
B143	Colin Flannigan	Full back	Melrose		South of Scotland		1986-03-02	France 'B'	2
B144	**Chris Gray**	Lock	Edinburgh Academicals	Nottingham	Anglo-Scots		1986-12-07	Italy 'B'	4
B145	**Greig Oliver**	Scrum half	Hawick		South of Scotland	Combined Scottish Districts	1986-12-07	Italy 'B'	2
B146	**Andrew Ker**	Fly half	Kelso		South of Scotland		1986-12-07	Italy 'B'	3
B147	**Alex Moore**	Wing	Gala	Edinburgh Academicals	South of Scotland	Edinburgh District	1986-12-07	Italy 'B'	3
B148	Henry Murray	Full back	Dunfermline		North and Midlands		1986-12-07	Italy 'B'	1
B149	**Jeremy Richardson**	Lock	Edinburgh Academicals		Edinburgh District		1987-02-07	France 'B'	6
B150	Tim Paterson-Brown	Wing	London Scottish		Anglo-Scots		1987-02-07	France 'B'	3
B151	David Leckie	(No. 8)	Edinburgh Academicals		Edinburgh District		1987-02-07	France 'B'	2
B152	**George Graham**	Prop	Stirling County		Glasgow District		1987-12-05	Italy 'B'	4
B153	**David Butcher**	Prop	Harlequins	Sale	Anglo-Scots	Combined Scottish Districts	1987-12-05	Italy 'B'	2
B154	**Damian Cronin**	Lock	Bath		Anglo-Scots		1987-12-05	Italy 'B'	1
B155	**Kevin Rafferty**	Flanker	Heriot's		Edinburgh District		1987-12-05	Italy 'B'	4
B156	**Graham Marshall**	No. 8	Wakefield		Anglo-Scots		1987-12-05	Italy 'B'	2
B157	**Gary Armstrong**	Scrum half	Jed-Forest		South of Scotland		1987-12-05	Italy 'B'	2
B158	**Ruari Maclean**	Centre	Gloucester	Moseley	Anglo-Scots		1987-12-05	Italy 'B'	4
B159	**Tim Exeter**	Centre	Moseley		Anglo-Scots		1987-12-05	Italy 'B'	1
B160	**Lindsay Renwick**	Wing	London Scottish		Anglo-Scots	Combined Scottish Districts	1987-12-05	Italy 'B'	4
B161	**Ian Ramsey**	Full back	Melrose		South of Scotland		1987-12-05	France 'B'	2
B162	**Shade Munro**	Lock	Glasgow High Kelvinside		Glasgow District		1988-03-20	France 'B'	3
B163	**Craig Chalmers**	Fly Half	Melrose		South of Scotland		1988-03-20	France 'B'	2
B164	**Derek Stark**	Wing	Kilmarnock	Ayr	Glasgow District	Cities District	1988-03-20	France 'B'	5
B165	**Paul Burnell**	Prop	London Scottish		Anglo-Scots		1988-12-04	Italy 'B'	1
B166	**Rob Wainwright**	No. 8	Dundee HSFP	Cambridge University	North and Midlands	Anglo-Scots	1988-12-04	Italy 'B'	3
B167	Graeme MacGregor	Scrum half	Glasgow Academicals		Glasgow District		1988-12-04	Italy 'B'	1
B168	Brian Edwards	Centre	Boroughmuir		North and Midlands	Edinburgh District	1988-12-04	Italy 'B'	4
B169	Crawford McGuffie	Centre	Ayr		Glasgow District		1988-12-04	Italy 'B'	1
B170	Marshall Wright	Full back	Kelso		South of Scotland		1988-12-04	Italy 'B'	2
B171	**Jim Hay**	Hooker	Hawick		South of Scotland		1989-02-18	France 'B'	2
B172	**Peter Wright**	Prop	Boroughmuir		Edinburgh District		1989-02-18	France 'B'	1
B173	**George Buchanan-Smith**	Flanker	London Scottish		Anglo-Scots		1989-02-18	France 'B'	1
B174	Julian Scott	Scrum half	Stewart's Melville		Edinburgh District		1989-02-18	France 'B'	1
B175	David Shiel	Fly Half	Jed-Forest		South of Scotland		1989-02-18	France 'B'	2
B176	Murray Walker	(Fly Half)	Boroughmuir		Edinburgh District		1989-02-18	France 'B'	1
B177	**Kevin McKenzie**	Hooker	Stirling County		Glasgow District		1989-12-09	Ireland 'B'	1
B178	**Grant Wilson**	Prop	Boroughmuir		Edinburgh District		1989-12-09	Ireland 'B'	3
B179	**Doddie Weir**	Lock	Melrose		South of Scotland		1989-12-09	Ireland 'B'	1
B180	Derek Busby	No. 8	Glasgow High Kelvinside		Glasgow District		1989-12-09	Ireland 'B'	2
B181	Stewart Porter	Wing	Malone		Anglo-Scots		1989-12-09	Ireland 'B'	4
B182	**Ian Jardine**	Centre	Stirling County		Glasgow District		1989-12-09	Ireland 'B'	3
B183	David Barrett	Full back	West of Scotland		Glasgow District		1989-12-09	Ireland 'B'	3

== 1990s ==
B184	**Ian Corcoran**	Hooker	Gala		South of Scotland		1990-01-21	France 'B'	1
B185	**Andy MacDonald**	Lock	Loughborough Students	Cambridge University	Anglo-Scots	Edinburgh District	1990-01-21	France 'B'	3
B186	George Breckenridge	Fly Half	Glasgow High Kelvinside		Glasgow District		1990-01-21	France 'B'	1
B187	Paul Rouse	Centre	Dundee HSFP		North and Midlands		1990-01-21	France 'B'	1
B188	**Peter Jones**	Prop	Gloucester		Anglo-Scots		1990-12-22	Ireland 'B'	2
B189	Harry Roberts	Hooker	London Scottish		Anglo-Scots		1990-12-22	Ireland 'B'	1
B190	Brian Robertson	Prop	Stirling County		Glasgow District		1990-12-22	Ireland 'B'	3
B191	**Stuart Reid**	Flanker	Boroughmuir		Edinburgh District	Cities District	1990-12-22	France 'B'	3
B192	**Ian Smith**	Flanker	Gloucester		Anglo-Scots		1990-12-22	Ireland 'B'	3
B193	Stuart Jardine	Scrum half	Glamorgan Wanderers		Anglo-Scots		1990-12-22	Ireland 'B'	1
B194	**Scott Nichol**	Fly half	Selkirk		South of Scotland		1990-12-22	Ireland 'B'	2
B195	Shaun McGauchie	Centre	Pontypool		Anglo-Scots		1990-12-22	Ireland 'B'	1
B196	**Craig Redpath**	Centre	Melrose		South of Scotland		1990-12-22	Ireland 'B'	2
B197	**Nick Grecian**	Wing	London Scottish		Anglo-Scots		1990-12-22	Ireland 'B'	1
B198	**Alan Watt**	Prop	Glasgow High Kelvinside		Glasgow District	Cities District	1991-03-02	France 'B'	1
B199	**Dave McIvor**	Flanker	Glenrothes	Edinburgh Academicals	North and Midlands		1991-03-02	France 'B'	2
B200	**Carl Hogg**	Flanker	Melrose		South of Scotland		1991-03-02	France 'B'	1
B201	**Andy Nicol**	Scrum half	Dundee HSFP		North and Midlands		1991-03-02	France 'B'	2
B202	**Cameron Glasgow**	Fly Half	Heriot's		Edinburgh District		1991-03-02	France 'B'	1
B203	**Mark Moncrieff**	Full back	Gala		South of Scotland		1991-03-02	France 'B'	3
B204	**Martin Scott**	Hooker	Dunfermline	Edinburgh Academicals	North and Midlands		1991-12-28	Ireland 'B'	2
B205	**Neil Edwards**	Lock	Harlequins	Northampton Saints	Anglo-Scots		1991-12-28	Ireland 'B'	1
B206	**Rob Scott**	Lock	London Scottish		Anglo-Scots		1991-12-28	Ireland 'B'	2
B207	Dale McIntosh	Flanker	Pontypridd		Anglo-Scots		1991-12-28	Ireland 'B'	2
B208	**Gregor Townsend**	Fly Half	Gala		South of Scotland		1991-12-28	Ireland 'B'	2
B209	Fraser Harrold	Centre	London Scottish		Anglo-Scots	Combined Scottish Districts	1991-12-28	Ireland 'B'	1
B210	Mark Appleson	Full back	London Scottish		Anglo-Scots	Combined Scottish Districts	1991-12-28	Ireland 'B'	2
B211	Mike Allingham	(Scrum half)	Heriot's		North and Midlands	Edinburgh District	1991-12-28	Ireland 'B'	1
B212	**Derrick Patterson**	Scrum half	Edinburgh Academicals		Edinburgh District		1992-02-02	France 'B'	1
B213	Don Caskie	Centre	Gloucester		Anglo-Scots		1992-02-02	France 'B'	1

== Notes ==
This list follows the SRU 2007-2008 Scottish Rugby Record which has the last list detailing the Scotland 'B' international players.

The 2007-2008 list ignores the 25 February 1976 Scotland 'B' match against the Royal Navy, both in debuts and in the player 'B' cap totals, and that omission is followed in this list.

All Scotland 'B' players that featured in that match were either already capped at 'B' level or subsequently capped.

There are players listed elsewhere like Eddie Pollock and James Scobbie that are sometimes recorded as 'B' internationals, but these players are not recorded on the 2007-2008 list, and are thus also omitted.
