= 1979–80 Scottish Inter-District Championship =

Rugby union competition

- Countries: Scotland
- Date: 1979–80
- Champions: Edinburgh District
- Runners-up: South
- Matches played: 6

The 1979–80 Scottish Inter-District Championship was a rugby union competition for Scotland's district teams.

This season saw the 27th Scottish Inter-District Championship.

Edinburgh District won the competition with 3 wins.

== 1979-80 League Table ==
Team	P	W	D	L	PF	PA	+/-	Pts
Edinburgh District	3	3	0	0	103	31	+72	6
South	3	2	0	1	78	28	+50	4
Glasgow District	3	1	0	2	41	31	+10	2
North and Midlands	3	0	0	3	19	151	-132	0

== Results ==
Date	Try	Conversion	Penalty	Dropped goal	Goal from mark	Notes
1977–1991	4 points	2 points	3 points	3 points	—	

=== Round 1 ===
29 December 1979 (after 8 December 1979 postponement)

Glasgow District	7 – 12	Edinburgh District
	Report

Murrayfield Stadium

Glasgow District:
Edinburgh District:

8 December 1979

South	51 – 3	North and Midlands
Try: Baird (3), Rutherford (2), Renwick, Tomes, Robertson, Ledingham; Con: Dods (2), Renwick (4); Pen: Dods	Herald report	Pen: Irvine

Philiphaugh, Selkirk
Referee: G.M. Anderson (Allan Glen's)

South of Scotland: P.W. Dods (Gala), D.J. Ledingham (Gala), J.M. Renwick (Hawick), K.W. Robertson (Melrose), G.R.T. Baird (Kelso), J.Y. Rutherford (Selkirk), R.J. Laidlaw (Jed-Forest) [captain]; J. Aitken (Gala), C.T. Deans (Hawick), N.E.K. Pender (Hawick), A.J. Tomes (Hawick), T.A. Smith (Gala), J.M. Berthinussen (Gala), G. Dickson (Gala), H.M. Barnfather (Langholm)
North and Midlands: K. Spowart (Dunfermline), C.D. Reekie (Howe of Fife), M.P.M. Stewart (Gordonians), S.R. Irvine (Gordonians), A.J. Croll (Gordonians), A.D. McCrae (Gordonians), J. Imrie (Howe of Fife); A.D.G. Mackenzie (Highland), J.A. Hardie (Gordonians), B.T.D. Diack (Kirkcaldy), C.E. Snape (Gordonians), C.M. Smylie (Gordonians), A.L. Dunlop (Highland), A.M. Ingle-Finch (Highland) [captain], I.A.M. Paxton (Glenrothes), G.Y. Mackie (Highland)

=== Round 2 ===
15 December 1979

North and Midlands	7 – 30	Glasgow District
Try: Croll; Pen: Sutherland	Herald report	Try: Campbell, Armstrong, J Gossman, Service; Con: B Gossman (4); Pen: B Gossman (2)

Canal Park, Inverness
Referee: E.N. Sheret (Howe of Fife)

North and Midlands: K. Spowart (Dunfermline), C.D. Reekie (Howe of Fife), M.P.M. Stewart (Gordonians), I.A. Sutherland (Moray), A.J. Croll (Gordonians), A.D. McCrae (Gordonians), J. Imrie (Howe of Fife); A.D.G. Mackenzie (Highland), J.A. Hardie (Gordonians), G. Brown (Dunfermline), C.E. Snape (Gordonians) [captain], A.L. Dunlop (Highland), G. Robertson (Gordonians), I.A.M. Paxton (Glenrothes), G.Y. Mackie (Highland) Replacement: C. Mackay (Dunfermline) for McCrae (79 minutes)
Glasgow District: C.D.R. Mair (West Of Scotland), S. Munro (Ayr), J.S. Gossman (West Of Scotland), A.G. Dougall (Jordanhill), A.D. Armstrong (Jordanhill), B.M. Gossman (West Of Scotland), A.M. Service (West Of Scotland); J. McLaughlan (Jordanhill) [captain], D.R. Livingston (West Of Scotland), H. Campbell (Jordanhill), D. Gray (West Of Scotland), W. Cuthbertson (Kilmarnock), G. Angus (Kilmarnock), J.R. Beattie (Glasgow Academicals), J.R. Dixon (Jordanhill)

15 December 1979

Edinburgh District	21 – 15	South
Try: Hay; Con: Irvine; Pen: Irvine (5)	Herald report	Try: Baird; Con: Dods; Pen: Dods (2); Drop: Rutherford

Goldenacre, Edinburgh
Referee: E. Anderson (Ardrossan Academicals)

Edinburgh District: A.R. Irvine (Heriots FP) [captain], R.S. Page (Heriots FP), A.E. Kennedy (Watsonians), D.I. Johnston (Watsonians), B.H. Hay (Boroughmuir), K.D.M. Wilson (Boroughmuir), A.J.M. Lawson (Heriots FP); J.N. Burnett (Heriots FP), J.C. Munro (Heriots FP), I.G. Milne (Heriots FP), D.G. Armstrong (Leith Academicals), I.K. Lambie (Watsonians), J.H. Calder (Stewart's Melville), W.S. Watson (Boroughmuir), A.K. Brewster (Stewart's Melville)
South of Scotland: P.W. Dods (Gala), D.J. Ledingham (Gala), J.M. Renwick (Hawick), K.W. Robertson (Melrose), G.R.T. Baird (Kelso), J.Y. Rutherford (Selkirk), R.J. Laidlaw (Jed-Forest) [captain]; J. Aitken (Gala), C.T. Deans (Hawick), N.E.K. Pender (Hawick), A.J. Tomes (Hawick), T.A. Smith (Gala), H.M. Barnfather (Langholm), G. Dickson (Gala), J.M. Berthinussen (Gala)

=== Round 3 ===
22 December 1979

Glasgow District	4 – 12	South
Try: Munro	Herald report	Try: Laidlaw; Con: Dods; Pen: Dods (2)

Murrayfield Stadium
Referee: I.C. Henderson (Trinity Academicals)

Glasgow District: A. Campbell (Hillhead), S. Munro (Ayr), J.S. Gossman (West Of Scotland), A.G. Dougall (Jordanhill), A.D. Armstrong (Jordanhill), B.M. Gossman (West Of Scotland), A.M. Service (West Of Scotland); J. McLaughlan (Jordanhill) [captain], D.R. Livingston (West Of Scotland), H. Campbell (Jordanhill), D. Gray (West Of Scotland), W. Cuthbertson (Kilmarnock), J.R. Dixon (Jordanhill), J.R. Beattie (Glasgow Academicals), G. Angus (Kilmarnock)
South of Scotland: P.W. Dods (Gala), D.J. Ledingham (Gala), J.M. Renwick (Hawick), K.W. Robertson (Melrose), G.R.T. Baird (Kelso), J.Y. Rutherford (Selkirk), R.J. Laidlaw (Jed-Forest) [captain]; J. Aitken (Gala), C.T. Deans (Hawick), R.F. Cunningham (Gala), K.R. Macaulay (Gala), T.A. Smith (Gala), C.B. Hegarty (Hawick), A.J. Campbell (Hawick), G. Dickson (Gala)

12 January 1980 (after 22 December 1979 postponement)

Edinburgh District	70 – 9	North and Midlands
Try: Calder (2), Milne (2), Johnston (2), Kennedy (2), Page (2), Brewster, penalty Con: Irvine (8); Pen: Irvine (2)	Herald report	Try: Cochrane; Con: Cochrane; Pen: Cochrane

Murrayfield Stadium
Referee: J. Dinsmore (West Of Scotland)

Edinburgh District: A.R. Irvine (Heriots FP) [captain], R.S. Page (Heriots FP), A.E. Kennedy (Watsonians), D.I. Johnston (Watsonians), B.H. Hay (Boroughmuir), K.D.M. Wilson (Boroughmuir), A.J.M. Lawson (Heriots FP); D Brewster (Stewart's Melville), J.C. Munro (Heriots FP), I.G. Milne (Heriots FP), D.G. Armstrong (Leith Academicals), I.K. Lambie (Watsonians), J.H. Calder (Stewart's Melville), W.S. Watson (Boroughmuir), A.K. Brewster (Stewart's Melville)
North and Midlands: K.J.M. Spowart (Dunfermline), C.D. Reekie (Howe of Fife), D Cochrane (Harris Academicals), I.A. Sutherland (Moray), M.P.M. Stewart (Gordonians), R.L. Lamb (Harris Academicals), C. Mackay (Dunfermline); A.D.G. Mackenzie (Highland), J.A. Hardie (Gordonians), G. Brown (Dunfermline), C.E. Snape (Gordonians) [captain], A.L. Dunlop (Highland), G. Robertson (Gordonians), I.A.M. Paxton (Glenrothes), G.Y. Mackie (Highland) Replacements: K. Gillies (Strathmore) for Mackenzie (44 minutes), J. Imrie (Howe of Fife) for Paxton (51 minutes)

== Matches outwith the Championship ==
=== Other Scottish matches ===
10 October 1979

Glasgow District	–	Rest of the West

Hughenden

Glasgow:
Rest of the West:

16 October 1979

Glasgow District	–	Anglo-Scots

Hughenden

Glasgow:
Anglo-Scots:

=== Junior matches ===
7 November 1979

South	–	Glasgow District

Kelso

South:
Glasgow District:

28 November 1979

Glasgow District	–	Edinburgh District

Glasgow District:
Edinburgh District:

19 February 1980

Edinburgh District	–	South

Musselburgh

Edinburgh District:
South:

19 February 1980

Glasgow District	–	Midlands District

Kelso

Glasgow District:
Midlands District:

4 March 1980

Edinburgh District	–	Midlands District

Edinburgh

Edinburgh District:
Midlands District:

24 March 1980

Midlands District	–	South of Scotland District

Cupar

Midlands District:
South of Scotland District:

=== English matches ===
24 September 1979
5.30pm

South of Scotland District	14 - 6	(England) Northumberland
	Preview; Report

Netherdale, Galashiels
Referee: P. C. Robertson (Hawick)

South of Scotland District:
Northumberland:

26 September 1979

Edinburgh District	-	(England) Northumberland

Edinburgh District:
Northumberland:

26 September 1979

Lancashire (England)	9 - 3	Glasgow District
Try: Tony Wright; Con: Kevin O'Brien; Pen: Kevin O'Brien	Report	Drop: Sandy Service

Edge Hall Road, Orrell
Referee: V. J. Schwarz (Liverpool and District)

Lancashire:
Glasgow District:

2 October 1979

Durham County (England)	21 - 15	South of Scotland District
	Report

South Shields
Referee: F. A. Moulton (Durham Society)

Durham County:
South of Scotland District:

=== Trial matches ===
5 January 1980

Blues Trial	16 - 12	Whites Trial
	Preview; Report

Murrayfield Stadium
Referee: A. M. Hosie (Hillhead)

Blues:
Whites:

=== International matches ===
27 October 1979

South	–	New Zealand

Mansfield Park, Hawick

South:
New Zealand:

31 October 1979

Edinburgh District	–	New Zealand

Myreside

Edinburgh District:
New Zealand:

6 November 1979

Glasgow District	–	New Zealand

Hughenden

Glasgow District:
New Zealand:

14 November 1979

Anglo-Scots	–	New Zealand

Dundee

Anglo-Scots:
New Zealand:
