= 1974–75 Scottish Inter-District Championship =

Rugby union competition

- Countries: Scotland
- Date: 1974–75
- Champions: North and Midlands / Glasgow District
- Runners-up: Edinburgh District
- Matches played: 6

The 1974–75 Scottish Inter-District Championship was a rugby union competition for Scotland's district teams.

This season saw the 22nd Scottish Inter-District Championship.

North and Midlands and Glasgow District shared the competition with 2 wins and 1 loss.

The SRU allowed substitutes to be used in inter-district matches.

The Probables versus Possibles match was played in three thirds of 30 minutes each.

== 1974-75 League Table ==
Team	P	W	D	L	PF	PA	+/-	Pts
North and Midlands	3	2	0	1	36	26	+10	4
Glasgow District	3	2	0	1	29	28	+1	4
Edinburgh District	3	1	0	2	27	32	-5	2
South	3	1	0	2	29	35	-6	0

== Results ==
Date	Try	Conversion	Penalty	Dropped goal	Goal from mark	Notes
1971–1977	4 points	2 points	3 points	3 points	3 points	

=== Round 1 ===
23 October 1974

South of Scotland	15 – 16	Glasgow District
Try: Drew Gill; Roy Laidlaw; Turnbull; Pen: Fairbairn	Report	Try: Reid; McHardy; Con: McHardy; Pen: McHardy x 2

Poynder Park, Kelso
Referee: E. N. Sheret (Howe of Fife)

South of Scotland: G. A. Fairbairn (Kelso), Drew Gill (Gala), Jim Renwick (Hawick) [captain], Alastair Cranston (Hawick), G. W. Turnbull (Jedforest), Arthur Brown (Gala), Roy Laidlaw (Jedforest) Jim Aitken (Gala), Colin Deans (Hawick), Norman Pender (Hawick), Ian Barnes (Hawick), Alan Tomes (Hawick), R. Lindores (Jedforest), Gordon Dickson (Gala), Tommy Elliot (Langholm)
Glasgow District: A. Campbell (Hillhead), David Shedden (West of Scotland), Michael Hunter (Glasgow HSFP), J. F. G. Stewart (Jordanhill), Lewis Dick (Jordanhill), D. F. Reid (Glasgow Academicals), H. R. McHardy (Kilmarnock), Ian McLauchlan (Jordanhill) [captain], R. F. A. Balfour (Glasgow HSFP), Sandy Carmichael (West of Scotland), I. A. Gray (West of Scotland), D. Gray (West of Scotland), Richie Dixon (Jordanhill), D. M. Gilmore (Glasgow HSFP), R. Haldane (West of Scotland)

=== Round 2 ===
20 November 1974

South of Scotland	8 – 7	Edinburgh District
Try: Alan Tomes; Carruthers	Report	Try: Andy Irvine; Pen: Andy Irvine

Poynder Park, Kelso
Referee: Alan Hosie (Hillhead)

South of Scotland: Arthur Brown (Gala), Drew Gill (Gala), Jim Renwick (Hawick) [captain], Alastair Cranston (Hawick), A. B. White (Hawick), Colin Telfer (Hawick) [captain], Roy Laidlaw (Jedforest), Jim Aitken (Gala), Colin Deans (Hawick), B. Hislop (Langholm), Ian Barnes (Hawick), Alan Tomes (Hawick), R. Lindores (Jedforest), Gordon Dickson (Gala), Tommy Elliot (Langholm) Replacement: Harry Carruthers (Gala) for A. B. White (Hawick)
Edinburgh District: Bruce Hay (Boroughmuir), Andy Irvine (Heriots), Graham Hogg (Boroughmuir) [captain], Ian Forsyth (Stewarts Melville), J. Dunney (Boroughmuir), F. N. Dall (Heriots), K. J. W. Smith (Boroughmuir), W. S. Noble (Boroughmuir), J. C. Munro (Heriots), J. A. Stewart (Watsonians), M. Kennedy (Watsonians), Iain Lambie (Watsonians), A. Ingle-Finch (Boroughmuir), Bill Watson (Boroughmuir), N. M. Morrison (Boroughmuir)

=== Round 3 ===
7 December 1974

Edinburgh District	–	Glasgow District
	Report

Edinburgh District:
Glasgow District:

7 December 1974

North and Midlands	–	South of Scotland
	Report

North and Midlands:
South of Scotland:

=== Round 4 ===
21 December 1974

North and Midlands	18 – 13	Edinburgh District
	Report

North and Midlands:
Edinburgh District:

=== Round 5 ===
4 January 1975

Glasgow District	7 – 6	North and Midlands
	Report

Hughenden Stadium
Referee: J. Short (Hawick)

Glasgow District:
North and Midlands:

== Matches outwith the Championship ==
=== Other Scottish matches ===
25 September 1974

Renfrewshire	6 - 3	Ayrshire
	Report

Crookston
Referee: R. D. Jamieson (Hutchesons' GSFP)

Renfrewshire:
Ayrshire:

2 October 1974

Edinburgh District	20 – 20	Anglo-Scots
	Report

Edinburgh District:
Anglo-Scots:

9 October 1974
4.30pm

North of Scotland	4 - 50	Midlands District
	Preview; Report

Rubislaw, Aberdeen

North of Scotland:
Midlands District:

16 October 1974

North and Midlands	10 – 25	Anglo-Scots
Try: David Leslie; Pen: Aitchison x 2	Report	Try: Alan Lawson; Wilson; Friell; Fowlie; Con: Money x 3 Pen: Money

Meadowbank Stadium
Referee: W. K. Burrell (Gala)

North and Midlands: W. D. Aitchison (Highland), T. D. Dunlop (Dunfermline), M. B. Paul (Dunfermline), J. Adams (Dunfermline), D. I. Oliver (Gordonians), D. W. Arneil (Dunfermline) [captain], N. B. Leitch (Dunfermline), T. E. R. Young (Moray), A. S. Fraser (Highland), R. D. Young (Dunfermline), C. E. Snape (Gordonians), C. A. Galbraith (Dunfermline), I. D. Coull (Perthshire), George Mackie (Highland), David Leslie (Dundee HSFP)
Anglo-Scots: R. S. Money (Leicester), J. P. D. Macdonald (London Scottish), A. P. Friell (London Scottish), S. M. Griffin (Gosforth), D. G. Fowlie (London Scottish), R. Wilson (London Scottish), Alan Lawson (London Scottish), D. Fairbairn (London Scottish), D. S. Madsen (Gosforth), M. S. Lovett (London Scottish), Alastair McHarg (London Scottish) [captain], P. R. Hay (London Scottish), R. A. Mackenzie (London Scottish), R. W. M. Whitefield (London Scottish), J. G. Millican (Moseley)

6 November 1974

Glasgow District	23 – 14	Anglo-Scots
	Report

Hughenden Stadium
Referee: R. M. Aird (Aberdeen GSFP)

Glasgow District:
Anglo-Scots:

=== Trial matches ===
11 January 1975

Scotland Probables	16 - 19	Scotland Possibles
Try: Bill Steele x 2 Aitchison; Con: Aitchison; Morgan	Preview; Preview; Report	Try: Hunter; Tim Dunlop; Balfour; Con: Morgan x 2 Pen: Morgan

Murrayfield Stadium
Referee: A. M. Hosie (Hillhead)

Probables: D. Aitchison (Highland), W. C. C. Steele (London Scottish), J. M. Renwick (Hawick), I. R. McGeechan (Headingley), L. G. Dick (Jordanhill), C. Telfer (Hawick) [captain], A. J. M. Lawson (London Scottish), J. Aitken (Gala), R. F. A. Balfour (Glasgow HSFP), N. A. K. Pender (Hawick), A. J. Tomes (Hawick), I. A. Barnes (Hawick), N. A. McEwan (Highland), D. S. Watson (Boroughmuir), W. Lauder (Neath) Replacement: Alan Friell (London Scottish) moved from Possibles to play for Probables to replace Ian McGeechan; the tight five of Ian McLauchlan, D. F. Madsen, Sandy Carmichael, McHarg and Brown were promoted in the second third; Leslie and Biggar were promoted in the second third; Morgan was promoted to Probables in the last third.
Possibles: B. Hay (Boroughmuir), A. D. Gill (Gala), A. P. Friell (London Scottish), A. Dougan (Jordanhill), T. D. Dunlop (Dunfermline), R. Wilson (London Scottish), D. Morgan (Stewart's Melville) [captain], Ian McLauchlan (Jordanhill), D. F. Madsen (Gorforth), Sandy Carmichael (West of Scotland), A. F. McHarg (London Scottish), G. L. Brown (West of Scotland), R. A. Mackenzie (London Scottish), D. G. Leslie (Dundee HSFP), M. A. Biggar (London Scottish) Replacement: M. Hunter (Glasgow HSFP) replaced A. Dougan; David Bell (Watsonians) replaced Friell when he moved to play for Probables; McEwen and Watson were demoted in the second third; Balfour was demoted to Possibles in the last third.
Reserves in attendance as possible replacements: A. H. White (Hawick), M. D. Hunter (Glasgow HSFP), D. L. Bell (Watsonians), H. R. McHardy (Kilmarnock), A. C. Wilson (West of Scotland), C. D. Fisher (Waterloo), D. J. M. Smith (Glasgow HSFP), R. J. Dixon (Jordanhill), A. J. Preston (Gosforth and Newcastle University)

=== English matches ===
25 September 1974

Edinburgh District	12 - 3	Northumberland
	Report

Inverleith
Referee: A. Bryce (Dunfermline)

Edinburgh District:
Northumberland:

8 October 1974
5pm

Scottish Borders	29 - 7	Durham County
	Preview

Riverside Park, Jedburgh
Referee: P. C. Robertson (Hawick)

Scottish Borders:
Durham County:

9 October 1974
7pm

Glasgow District	51 - 9	Cumberland and Westmorland
	Preview; Report

Hughenden Stadium
Referee: J. G. Gow (Gordonians)

Glasgow District:
Cumberland and Westmorland:

16 October 1974

Cumberland and Westmorland	8 - 24	Edinburgh District
	Report

Carlisle
Referee: J. D. Lawson (Cumberland and Westmorland)

Cumberland and Westmorland:
Edinburgh District:

=== International matches ===
24 September 1974

Glasgow District	33 - 16	Tonga

Glasgow District:
Tonga:
