= 1986–87 Scottish Inter-District Championship =

Rugby union competition

- Countries: Scotland
- Date: 1986–87
- Champions: Edinburgh District
- Runners-up: South
- Matches played: 10

The 1986–87 Scottish Inter-District Championship was a rugby union competition for Scotland's district teams.

This season saw the 34th formal Scottish Inter-District Championship.

Edinburgh District won the competition with four wins.

Midlands fixtures for the season. Midlands - Edinburgh South - Ulster

== 1986-87 League Table ==
Team	P	W	D	L	PF	PA	+/-	Pts
Edinburgh District	4	4	0	0	96	51	+45	8
South	4	3	0	1	127	45	+82	6
Anglo-Scots	4	2	0	2	46	67	-21	4
Glasgow District	4	1	0	3	68	99	-31	2
North and Midlands	4	0	0	4	29	104	-75	0

== Results ==
Date	Try	Conversion	Penalty	Dropped goal	Goal from mark	Notes
1977–1991	4 points	2 points	3 points	3 points	—	

=== Round 1 ===
26 November 1986

Edinburgh District	42 – 16	Glasgow District
Try: Iain Milne; Stewart McAslan x 3 Gavin Hastings x 3 Jamie Paton; Murray Fisken; Con: Gavin Hastings x 2 Simon Scott	Report	Try: Steve Munro; E. D. McCorkindale; Con: Calum MacGregor; Pen: Calum MacGregor x 2

Meggetland Sports Complex
Referee: G. I. Inglis (Selkirk)

Edinburgh District: Gavin Hastings (Watsonians), S. W. McAslan (Heriots), Euan Kennedy (Watsonians), S. H. Scott (Stewarts Melville), M. M. Fisken (Boroughmuir), J. F. Paton (Edinburgh Academicals), M. D. Hall (Boroughmuir), Alex Brewster (Stewarts Melville) [captain], Kenny Milne (Heriots), Iain Milne (Heriots), J. S. Hamilton (Heriots), Jeremy Richardson (Edinburgh Academicals), Jim Calder (Stewarts Melville), Finlay Calder (Stewarts Melville), K. P. Rafferty (Heriots)
Glasgow District: D. H. Drummond (West of Scotland), S. Munro (Ayr), D. R. McKee (Jordanhill), Calum MacGregor (Boroughmuir), P. P. Manning (Ayr), D. R. Barrett (West of Scotland), E. D. McCorkindale (Glasgow High Kelvinside), Gerry McGuinness (West of Scotland), Graham Ellis (Glasgow Academicals), Brian Robertson (Stirling County), H. M. Parker (Kilmarnock), A. F. McDowall (Ayr), W. H. Malcolm (Glasgow Academicals), J. R. Beattie (Glasgow Academicals) [captain], J. D. Busby (Hillhead). Replacement: D. R. Livingston (West of Scotland) for Beattie.

=== Round 2 ===
29 November 1986

Anglo-Scots	22 – 6	North and Midlands
Try: Chris Gray; Jones; Gary Irvine; Stuart Irvine; Pen: Stuart Irvine; Drop: Russell	Report	Pen: Graham x 2

Richmond
Referee: W. W. Calder (Selkirk)

Anglo-Scots: S. R. Irvine (London Scottish), J. C. W. Beazley (Edinburgh Wanderers), R. McLean (Gloucester), D. R. M. Bruce Lockhart (London Scottish), T. Paterson-Brown (London Scottish), C. Russell (Wasps), G. J. M. Irvine (Harrogate), P. Jones (Gloucester), I. Kirk (London Scottish), D. Butcher (Sale), Jeremy Campbell-Lamerton (London Scottish) [captain], Chris Gray (Nottingham), S. Smith (Gosforth), A. J. Macklin (London Scottish), Iain Morrison (London Scottish). Replacement: R. Cunningham (Wasps) for Macklin (44 minutes)
North and Midlands: C. J. Macartney (Boroughmuir), R. Harris (Howe of Fife), B. Edwards (Boroughmuir), D. K. Graham (Highland), M. Cross (Dunfermline), N. J. Marshall (Heriots), N. Sharp (Dunfermline), P. Flockhart (Highland), D. Wylie (Boroughmuir), J. L. Scobbie (Glasgow Academicals), C. A. Galbraith (Boroughmuir), I. T. Rankin (Howe of Fife), J. G. Bryce (Heriots), D. Leckie (Edinburgh Academicals), H. J. Edwards (Boroughmuir) [captain]

29 November 1986

Glasgow District	15 – 36	South
Try: Steve Munro; Con: Calum MacGregor; Pen: Calum MacGregor x 3	Report	Try: John Rutherford x 2 Iwan Tukalo x 2 Alan Tait; Con: Peter Dods x 2 Pen: Peter Dods x 3 Drop: John Rutherford

Hughenden Stadium
Referee: R. J. Megson (Edinburgh Wanderers)

Glasgow District: R. Kemp (Kilmarnock), S. Munro (Ayr), D. R. McKee (Jordanhill), A. G. Ker (Glasgow Academicals), P. P. Manning (Ayr), Calum MacGregor (Boroughmuir), A. G. J. Nicolson (Ayr), G. M. McGuinness (West of Scotland), D. R. Livingston (West of Scotland), Brian Robertson (Stirling County), J. Riozzi (West of Scotland), A. F. McDowall (Ayr), W. H. Malcolm (Glasgow Academicals) [captain], J. D. Busby (Hillhead), K. Young (Kilmarnock). Replacement: R. T. S. Bedford (Jordanhill) for Malcolm (74 minutes)
South: Peter Dods (Gala), Alan Tait (Kelso), Keith Murray (Hawick), Roger Baird (Kelso), Iwan Tukalo (Selkirk), John Rutherford (Selkirk), Roy Laidlaw (Jedforest), T. G. Waite (Kelso), Colin Deans (Hawick) [captain], R. A. Nichol (Hawick), Alister Campbell (Hawick), Iain Paxton (Selkirk), R. E. Paxton (Kelso), John Jeffrey (Kelso), Derek Turnbull (Hawick)

=== Round 3 ===
6 December 1986

North and Midlands	6 – 39	South
Pen: Macartney; Marshall	Report	Try: John Jeffrey x 2 Rutherford; Baird; Tukalo; Campbell; Con: Dods x 3 Pen: Dods x 3

Mayfield, Dundee
Referee: Jim Fleming (Boroughmuir)

North and Midlands: G. Spowart (Dundee HSFP), C. J. Macartney (Boroughmuir), B. Edwards (Boroughmuir), P. F. Rouse (Dundee HSFP), M. Cross (Dunfermline), N. J. Marshall (Heriots), K. Troup (Gordonians), P. Flockhart (Highland), D. Wylie (Boroughmuir), A. Wemyss (Highland), B. H. Bell (Highland) [captain], I. T. Rankin (Howe of Fife), H. J. Edwards (Boroughmuir), D. Leckie (Edinburgh Academicals), D. McIvor (Dunfermline)
South: Peter Dods (Gala), Roger Baird (Kelso), Keith Murray (Hawick), Keith Robertson (Melrose), Iwan Tukalo (Selkirk), John Rutherford (Selkirk), Roy Laidlaw (Jedforest), K. S. Sudlow (Jedforest), Colin Deans (Hawick) [captain], R. A. Nichol (Hawick), Alister Campbell (Hawick), A. J. Tomes (Hawick), R. E. Paxton (Kelso), Iain Paxton (Selkirk), John Jeffrey (Kelso)

=== Round 4 ===
13 December 1986

North and Midlands	7 – 16	Edinburgh District
Try: Cross; Pen: Macartney	Report	Try: Millar; Finlay Calder; Con: Gavin Hastings; Pen: Gavin Hastings x 2

Duffus Park, Cupar
Referee: P. C. Robertson (Hawick)

North and Midlands: H. M. Murray (Dunfermline), M. Cross (Dunfermline), R. D. K. Graham (Highland), B. Edwards (Boroughmuir), C. J. Macartney (Boroughmuir), N. J. Marshall (Heriots), K. Troup (Gordonians), P. Flockhart (Highland),
Edinburgh District:

13 December 1986

South	34 – 3	Anglo-Scots

Mansfield Park

South:
Anglo-Scots:

=== Round 5 ===
20 December 1986

Edinburgh District	17 – 10	Anglo-Scots

Myreside

Edinburgh District:
Anglo-Scots:

20 December 1986

Glasgow District	27 – 10	North and Midlands

Old Anniesland

Glasgow District:
North and Midlands:

=== Round 6 ===
27 December 1986

Anglo-Scots	11 – 10	Glasgow District
	Report

Imber Court, Surrey
Referee: A. P. Thomson (London Society)

Anglo-Scots:
Glasgow District:

27 December 1986

South	18 – 21	Edinburgh District
	Report

Netherdale
Referee: D. Leslie (Manchester)

South:
Edinburgh District:

== Matches outwith the Championship ==
=== Other Scottish matches ===
8 October 1986

Glasgow trial	-

Glasgow trial:
-:

22 October 1986

Midlands Blues Trial	-	Midlands Whites Trial
	Preview

North Inch, Perth

Midland Blues Trial:
Midland Whites Trial:

5 November 1986

Midlands District	18 - 23	Edinburgh District
Try: Hiscoke; Manson; Con: Frame x 2 Pen: Frame x 2	Report	Try: Guild; Blundell; Lorento; Munro; Con: Rankine x 2 Pen: Rankine

Duffus Park, Cupar

Midlands District:
Edinburgh District:

19 November 1986

Midlands District	6 - 14	Glasgow District
	Report

Duffus Park, Cupar

Midlands District:
Glasgow District:

26 November 1986

Ayrshire	30 - 6	Dumfries and Galloway
	Report

Millbrae

Ayrshire:
Dumfries and Galloway:

26 November 1986

Renfrewshire	16 - 15	Lanarkshire
	Report

Braidholm
Referee: I. Lockhart (Hillhead)

Renfrewshire:
Lanarkshire:

10 December 1986

Renfrewshire	0 - 4	Dunbartonshire
	Preview; Report	Try: Chris Reid

Braidholm
Referee: J. Johnston (Gala Y.M.)

Renfrewshire:
Dunbartonshire:

10 December 1986

Ayrshire	40 - 12	Lanarkshire
	Report

Ardrossan
Referee: L. Crerar (Glasgow High Kelvinside)

Ayrshire:
Lanarkshire:

=== Junior matches ===
5 October 1986

Glasgow	8 - 20	South
	Report

Hughenden Stadium

Glasgow:
South:

3 December 1986

South of Scotland	9 - 0	Midlands District
	Report

Kelso

South of Scotland:
Midlands District:

=== Trial matches ===
3 January 1987

Blues Trial	28 - 9	Reds Trial
Try: Tukalo; Sole; Scott Hastings; M. D. F. Duncan; Paxton; Con: Gavin Hastings; Pen: Gavin Hastings x 2	Report; Report	Try: Jim Calder; Con: Peter Dods; Pen: Peter Dods

Murrayfield Stadium
Referee: J. M. Fleming (Boroughmuir)

Blues: A. G. Hastings (Watsonians), M. D. F. Duncan (West of Scotland), D. S. Wylie (Stewart's Melville), S. Hastings (Watsonians), I. Tulako (Selkirk), J. Rutherford (Selkirk), R. J. Laidlaw (Jedforest), D. M. B. Sole (Bath), C. T. Deans (Hawick) [captain], I. G. Milne (Heriots), A. J. Campbell (Hawick), I. A. M. Paxton (Selkirk), J. Jeffrey (Kelso), J. R. Beattie (Glasgow Academicals), F. Calder (Stewart's Melville). Replacement: G. M. McGuinness for D. Sole (74 minutes)
Reds: P. W. Dods (Gala), S. W. McAslan (Heriots), Euan Kennedy (Watsonians), A. V. Tait (Kelso), T. Patterson-Brown (London Scottish), A. B. M. Ker (Kelso), G. H. Oliver (Hawick), A. K. Brewster (Stewart's Melville), G. J. Callander (Kelso) [captain], T. G. Waite (Kelso), H. M. Parker (Kilmarnock), A. J. Tomes (Hawick), Jim Calder (Stewart's Melville), D. B. White (Gala), D. J. Turnbull (Hawick). Replacement: N. A. Rowan (Boroughmujir) for Waite (48 minutes)

=== English matches ===
1 September 1986

Edinburgh District	-	Kent
	Preview

Inverleith

Edinburgh District:
Kent:

2 September 1986

Glasgow District	-	Kent
	Preview

Hughenden

Glasgow District:
Kent:

24 September 1986

South of Scotland	12 - 13	Durham County
	Preview; Report

Milntown
Referee: D. Thomas (Edinburgh Wanderers)

South of Scotland:
Durham County:

=== Irish matches ===
13 September 1986

South of Scotland	21 - 20	Ulster
	Report

Jedburgh

South of Scotland:
Durham County:

=== American matches ===
8 September 1986

North and Midlands	20 - 19	Eastern Rugby Union USA
	Preview; Report

Mayfield

North and Midlands:
Eastern:

=== International matches ===
17 September 1986

South of Scotland District	45 - 12	Japan
	Report

The Greenyards

South of Scotland District:
Japan:

20 September 1986

North and Midlands	19 - 27	Japan
	Report

Seafield
Referee: I. Bullerwell (East Midlands)

North and Midlands:
Japan:

23 September 1986

Edinburgh District	26 - 14	Japan
	Preview; Report

Myreside
Referee: A. Turner (Lancashire)

Edinburgh District:
Japan:
