= Rugby union in the Scottish Borders =

Rugby union in the Scottish Borders has a long, and significant history.

The region has been responsible for several major innovations, and a presence in the national game which is disproportionately large, because it is the one part of Scotland where rugby is the main sport and played by all classes.

== History ==
For centuries Borderers had been playing various forms of folk football, that were extremely similar to rugby. Some of these are still played very occasionally, such as the game in Jedburgh. Undoubtedly their popularity paved the way for that of rugby. Ned Haig, for example played Fastern's Eve Ba'.

Throughout the mid-to-late-1870s, another almost parallel world of club rugby grew up in the Scottish Borders. This brand of rugby, imported from Yorkshire through the burgeoning woollen industry, was a world away from the refined old boy circuit of Edinburgh and Glasgow. The Borders remains the only part of Scotland – outside the predominantly middle-class atmosphere of the Edinburgh elite – where rugby really managed to take root in Scotland. In small towns where there was little or no association football, clubs such as Gala, Hawick, Selkirk, Jed Forest, and Melrose, soon became the sporting focus for the hardy farming communities nearby.

Although the population of the Borders is only 100,000, but amidst local rivalries, it has produced some of the best players to come out of Scottish, or even European rugby. Many of the Scottish sides, including those who won the Grand Slam of 1990, contained a substantial number of Borderers. It says much for the quality of play in the area that the towns from which the three club sides in Scotland hail from – Hawick, Galashiels and Melrose – have populations of 14,800, 12,300 and 1670 respectively.

== Borders rugby ==
The area of Borders rugby is largely contiguous with Scottish Borders region, but also taking in Langholm and Biggar.

Although the bulk of Borders rugby can be found in and around mid and lower Tweedsdale, the Border rugby region also takes in the likes of Langholm in Dumfriesshire in the south west, and Peebles, Innerleithen and Biggar (traditionally part of South Lanarkshire) in the west. The town of Berwick upon Tweed also has a strong association with the region, and its rugby club frequently plays against sides in the area.

== Border League ==
As well as being geographically and culturally divorced from their city counterparts, the Borders clubs soon developed a competition of their own, the Border League, which is still contested, and which remains the oldest organised league competition in world rugby.

== Rugby sevens ==
The Borders is also the birthplace of the abbreviated code of the sevens, which is somewhat ironic since Borders rugby has traditionally been built around forward muscle, rather than fluent back play.

The code was invented in 1883, when Melrose butcher and fly-half Ned Haig suggested a shortened version of the game, as a means of raising money at a local fair. The idea was a resounding success, with Melrose beating Gala in extra time to win the competition, and soon most towns in the Borders staged their own annual sevens tournaments in April and May.

In 1983, the French winners donated their Melrose Sevens medals to local schoolchildren as a gesture of goodwill. The decision reportedly caused controversy among some local residents, highlighting the significance of the Melrose Sevens winners' medals in the Scottish Borders. [citation needed]

The Melrose Cup is the main prize of the Rugby World Cup Sevens, and is named after this.

== South of Scotland ==
The South of Scotland rugby union team (The South) is a select team made up of the best players from the Border region. They would take on overseas touring sides, drawing with South Africa on two occasions and famously beating an excellent 1984 Australia touring team. They also competed in the Scottish Inter-District Championship against Edinburgh District, Glasgow District and the North and Midlands.

In 1995, with the advent of professionalism in Rugby union, the SRU decided to professionalise The South District team as the Border Reivers.

== Border Reivers ==
The Border Reivers were one of four professional sides set up by the SRU in 1996, from the traditional amateur District sides. The others were Glasgow Warriors, Edinburgh Rugby and Caledonia Reds.

Their appearance was initially regarded with some suspicion and derision, yet it was due to the SRU's high debt that the axe fell on the Reivers just two years later. The Caledonia Reds met the same fate.

The Border Reivers were merged into Edinburgh Rugby in 1998, to form the Edinburgh Reivers. In effect, though, the Borders side was effectively disbanded. Edinburgh quietly dropped the Reivers name later.

The establishment of a Celtic League in 2001 gave the SRU more confidence. It resurrected the Border Reivers side in 2002 and they competed in the Celtic League, Heineken Cup and Challenge Cup. However the team largely struggled in the league.

The side was disbanded in 2007. The Reivers did pick up something of a following and their demise was a minor scandal. Part of the problem was that while the Borders have produced much of Scotland's best rugby, they did not necessarily have the population to support such a team.

== Clubs ==
The district includes clubs from the Scottish Borders as well as two clubs, Berwick and Langholm, and are actually situated in Northumberland and Dumfries & Galloway respectively.

=== BT Premiership ===
The BT Premiership is the premier club competition over the Scottish Borders region.

=== National leagues ===
BT National Leagues is an amateur league competition for rugby union clubs in Scotland. It forms the 2nd tier of the Scottish League Championship.

=== East leagues ===
The East leagues cover the Edinburgh & District and the Scottish Borders area. They play at a level below that of the National Leagues structure. Winners of the league may progress to the National League.

The Scottish Borders consists of 17 clubs, the highest density of clubs per population in Scotland.

- Gala
- Melrose
- Hawick
- Selkirk
- Kelso
- Peebles
- Jed-Forest
- Hawick YM
- Berwick
- Duns
- Langholm
- Hawick Linden
- Hawick Harlequins
- St Boswells
- Earlston
- Walkerburn
- Gala YM

== Notable rugby players from the Borders ==
Gala RFC

- Jim Aitken
- Peter Brown
- Peter Dods
- Michael Dods
- David Leslie
- Chris Paterson
- Duncan Paterson
- Gregor Townsend
- Jock Turner
- Derek White

Hawick RFC

- Jock Beattie
- Colin Deans
- Stuart Hogg
- Willie Kyle
- Bill McLaren
- Hugh McLeod
- Jim Renwick
- Adam Robson
- Tony Stanger
- Alan Tomes

Jed Forest RFC

- Gary Armstrong
- Greig Laidlaw
- Roy Laidlaw

Kelso RFC

- Roger Baird
- George Fairbairn
- Ross Ford
- John Jeffrey
- Alan Tait

Melrose RFC

- Ned Haig
- Craig Joiner
- Keith Robertson
- Jim Telfer
- Doddie Weir

Selkirk RFC

- Douglas Christie
- John Rutherford

== See also ==
- Rugby union in Scotland
- Rugby union in the British Isles
