= Hawick F.C. =

Hawick FC could refer to the following:

- Hawick RFC (rugby union)
- Hawick Harlequins RFC (rugby union)
- Hawick Royal Albert F.C. (association football)
