= Lewis Dick =

Scotland international rugby union player

- Born: Lewis Gibson Dick; 20 December 1950 (age 75) Perth, Scotland
- School: Morrison's Academy
- University: Loughborough University

Rugby union career
- Position: Wing
Amateur team(s)
Years	Team	Apps	(Points)
-	Loughborough Students		
–	Jordanhill		
–	Swansea		
–	Gloucester		
Provincial / State sides
Years	Team	Apps	(Points)
-	Glasgow District		
-	Scotland Probables		
-	Anglo-Scots		
International career
Years	Team	Apps	(Points)
1971	Scotland 'B'	1	
1972-77	Scotland	14	(8)
-	Barbarians		
Coaching career
- Years: Team
- –: Cheltenham North

Lewis Dick (born 20 November 1950) is a former Scotland rugby union international player.

== Early life ==
Lewis Dick was born on 20 December 1950 in Perth. He attended Morrison's Academy, an independent school in Crieff, from 1963 to 1969.

He was talented at athletics was the Scottish Junior champion for the Triple Jump. He planned to try out for the Scotland team to make the 1970 Commonwealth Games in the event.

== Rugby Union career ==
=== Amateur career ===
While at Loughborough University, he played rugby union for Loughborough Students.

He played for Jordanhill.

He then played for Swansea.

He also played for Gloucester.

=== Provincial career ===
He was capped by Glasgow District. He was part of the Glasgow team that shared the Scottish Inter-District Championship title in 1974-75 season with North and Midlands.

He played for Scotland Probables in the trial match of 11 January 1975.

While with Gloucester he then turned out for the Anglo-Scots.

=== International career ===
He was capped by Scotland 'B' to play France 'B' in 1971.

Dick made his international debut on 5 February 1972 at Cardiff Arms Park in the Wales vs Scotland match. Of the 14 matches he played for his national side he was on the winning side on 6 occasions.

He played in the 'Water Polo test' – a Scotland match against the All Blacks in New Zealand in 1975 – that was so dubbed because of the terrible conditions that made the Eden Park match seem as if it was played in a swimming pool. New Zealand played the conditions better and handsomely won the match; but it was Dick's kick down the New Zealand end that summed up the match. Instead of creating Scotland pressure, the ball stuck in a puddle and gave Bryan Williams the time to collect the ball, then turn and build up speed and race down the other end of the pitch for a New Zealand try.

He played his final match for Scotland on 15 January 1977 at Twickenham in the England vs Scotland match.

He played for the Barbarians in 1975, scoring tries in a match against Newport.

=== Administrative career ===
He joined the SRU selection committee for Scotland Under 21s in 1993.

=== Coaching career ===
He coached Cheltenham North rugby club.

== Business career ==
He worked for Wagon Finance as a Regional Manager. While there he got the company to sponsor Gloucester RFC.
