= Gavin Hastings =

British Lions & Scotland international rugby union player

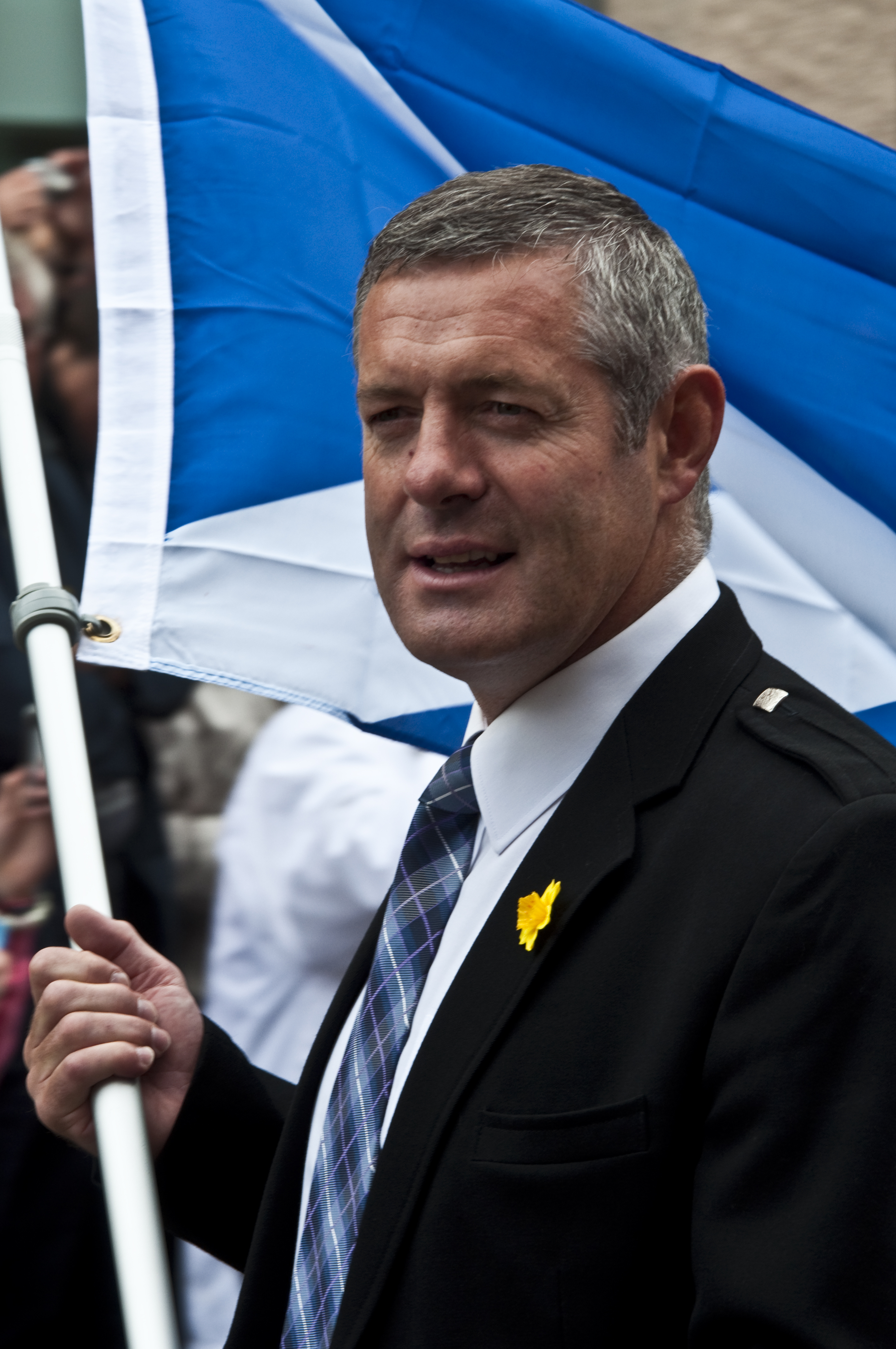
- Full name: Andrew Gavin Hastings
- Born: 3 January 1962 (age 64) Edinburgh, Scotland
- Height: 188 cm (6 ft 2 in)
- Weight: 91 kg (201 lb; 14 st 5 lb)
- School: George Watson's College
- University: Cambridge University; Paisley College of Technology
- Notable relative(s): Adam Hastings (son); Scott Hastings (brother)

Rugby union career
- Position: Fullback
Senior career
Years	Team	Apps	(Points)
- Cambridge University
- Watsonians
- London Scottish
- Edinburgh District
- Scottish Exiles
- Correct as of 19 November 2022
International career
Years	Team	Apps	(Points)
1983–1985	Scotland 'B'	5	
1986–1995	Scotland	61	(667)
1986, 1989, 1993	British Lions	6	(66)
- Correct as of 19 November 2022

Gavin Hastings
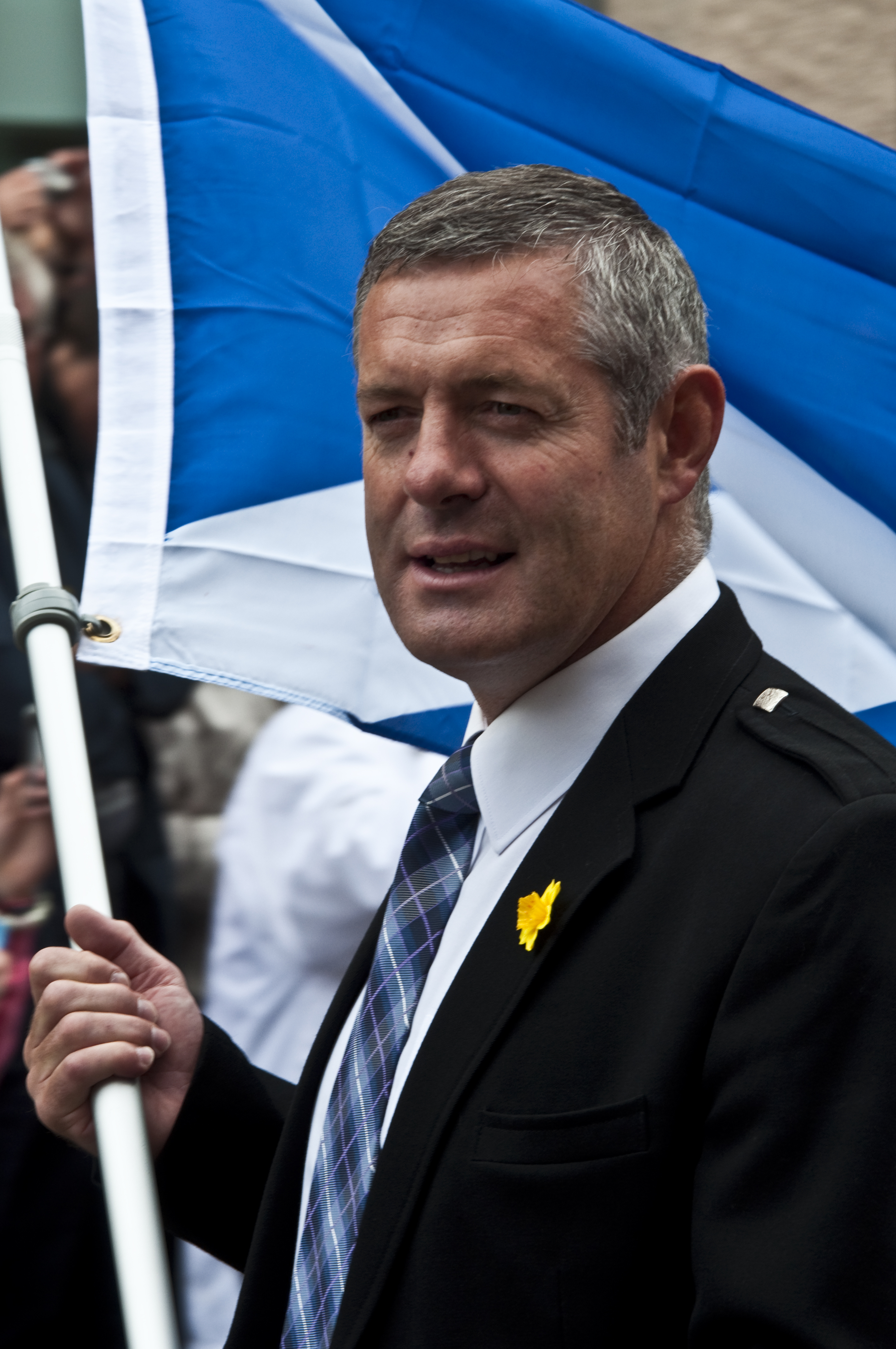

No. 15
- Position: Placekicker

Career history
- Scottish Claymores (1996)

Awards and highlights
- World Bowl '96 winner

Career WLAF statistics
- PAT: 23/27
- FG: 0/1

Andrew Gavin Hastings, OBE (born 3 January 1962) is a Scottish former rugby union player. A fullback, he is widely regarded to be one of the best ever Scottish rugby players and was one of the outstanding players of his generation, winning 61 caps for Scotland, 20 of which as captain. He played for Watsonians, London Scottish, Cambridge University, Scotland and the British Lions. He twice toured with the Lions, to Australia in 1989 and as captain on the 1993 tour to New Zealand.

== Early life ==
Hastings was born in Edinburgh, and was educated at George Watson's College, Edinburgh, Paisley College of Technology (now the University of the West of Scotland), and Magdalene College, Cambridge, where he studied Land Economy and graduated with a BA in 1986.

== Rugby union career ==
=== Amateur career ===
Hastings captained the victorious 1985 Cambridge University side, and during his sabbatical year he won the Gallaher Shield with Auckland University Rugby Football Club. In Scotland, Hastings played for Watsonians.

=== Provincial and professional career ===
Hastings played for Edinburgh District in the era before professionalism, before switching to the club side London Scottish, and also then turned out for the Scottish Exiles.

When rugby union turned professional in 1996, he was still playing for London Scottish.

=== International career ===
Hastings captained the first Scottish schoolboys' side to win on English soil.

He won 5 caps for Scotland 'B' between 1983 and 1985.

Hastings made his debut for Scotland against France in 1986 and was a central figure in Scotland's 1990 Five Nations Grand Slam. In February 1995 he became the holder of a record number of Scottish caps when he made his 53rd full international appearance, passing Colin Deans and Jim Renwick.

Hastings's final game was on 11 June 1995 against New Zealand in Pretoria at the quarter-finals of the 1995 Rugby World Cup. By the end of that match he had scored 667 international points, a Scottish record that stood until surpassed by Chris Paterson in 2008.

Hastings captained Scotland on 20 occasions including at the 1995 World Cup.

Hastings first played for the British Lions in 1986, against a Rest of the World XV, before playing in all three tests of the successful 1989 tour to Australia and against France in 1989. He was captain on the 1993 tour to New Zealand, where the Lions lost the test series 2–1.

=== Administrative career ===
On 30 August 2007 Hastings was announced as the chairman of the new Edinburgh professional rugby club.

== American football career ==
In 1996, Hasting joined the Scottish Claymores, an American football team in the NFL Europe. He played a single season as a placekicker, scoring 24 of 27 conversions, but missed his only attempt at a field goal. Despite the Claymores winning the World Bowl, Hastings was released at the end of the season.

== Family ==
Hastings' younger brother Scott was also a Scotland international player.

His son, Adam plays for Montpellier and also has represented Scotland. His niece represented Scotland at hockey.

Hastings' wife, Diane, whom he married in 1993, was diagnosed with Parkinson's Disease in 2003.

Hastings's nickname is "Big Gav".

== Honours and awards ==
Hastings awarded an Honorary Blue from Heriot Watt University in 1995 for his contribution to sport at a national level.

Hastings was awarded the Order of the British Empire in 1993 for services to rugby union.

Hastings was inducted into the International Rugby Hall of Fame in 2003 and later into the World Rugby Hall of Fame in 2013.

Since its formation in 2001, Hastings has been the Patron of Sandpiper Trust, a Scottish charity which provides life-saving medical equipment to rural doctors, nurses and paramedics across Scotland.

=== Scotland ===
As of 22 March 2022.

Try	Opposing Team	Venue	Competition	Date	Result	Score
1	Wales	National Stadium, Cardiff	1986 Five Nations Championship	1 February 1986	Loss	22–15
2	Zimbabwe	Athletic Park, Wellington	1987 Rugby World Cup	30 May 1987	Win	60–21
3	Romania	Carisbrook, Dunedin	1987 Rugby World Cup	2 June 1987	Win	28–55
4	Romania	Carisbrook, Dunedin	1987 Rugby World Cup	2 June 1987	Win	28–55
5	France	Murrayfield Stadium, Edinburgh	1988 Five Nations Championship	6 February 1988	Win	23–12
6	Australia	Murrayfield Stadium, Edinburgh	1988 Australia rugby union tour of England, Scotland and Italy	19 November 1988	Loss	13–32
7	Fiji	Murrayfield Stadium, Edinburgh	1989 Fiji rugby union tour of Europe	28 October 1989	Win	38–17
8	Argentina	Murrayfield Stadium, Edinburgh	1990 Argentina rugby union tour of British Isles	10 November 1990	Win	49–3
9	Ireland	Murrayfield Stadium, Edinburgh	1991 Five Nations Championship	16 March 1991	Win	28–25
10	Japan	Murrayfield Stadium, Edinburgh	1991 Rugby World Cup	5 October 1991	Win	47–9
11	France	Parc de Princes, Paris	1995 Five Nations Championship	18 February 1995	Win	21–23
12	Romania	Murrayfield Stadium, Edinburgh	Test Match	22 April 1995	Win	49–16
13	Ivory Coast	Olympia Park, Rustenburg	1995 Rugby World Cup	26 May 1995	Win	0–89
14	Ivory Coast	Olympia Park, Rustenburg	1995 Rugby World Cup	26 May 1995	Win	0–89
15	Ivory Coast	Olympia Park, Rustenburg	1995 Rugby World Cup	26 May 1995	Win	0–89
16	Ivory Coast	Olympia Park, Rustenburg	1995 Rugby World Cup	26 May 1995	Win	0–89
17	Tonga	Loftus Versfeld, Pretoria	1995 Rugby World Cup	29 May 1995	Win	41–5

=== British & Irish Lions ===
Try	Opposing Team	Venue	Competition	Date	Result	Score
1	Australia	Ballymore Stadium, Brisbane	1989 British Lions tour to Australia	8 July 1989	Win	12–19
