= Ian Corcoran =

Scotland international rugby union player

- Born: Ian Corcoran; 11 May 1963 (age 63) Edinburgh, Scotland

Rugby union career
- Position: Hooker
Amateur team(s)
Years	Team	Apps	(Points)
- Gala
Provincial / State sides
Years	Team	Apps	(Points)
- South of Scotland District
International career
Years	Team	Apps	(Points)
1990	Scotland 'B'	1	
1992	Scotland 'A'	2	
1992	Scotland	1	(0)

Ian Corcoran (born 11 May 1963) is a former Scotland international rugby union player. His regular playing position was Hooker.

== Rugby Union career ==
=== Amateur career ===
Corcoran played for Gala.

=== Provincial career ===
Corcoran played for South of Scotland District.

=== International career ===
Corcoran was capped by Scotland 'B' against France 'B' in 1990.

Corcoran was capped by Scotland 'A' twice, against Spain and Italy in 1992.

Corcoran was capped once for Scotland, in 1992.
