= Hamish Bryce =

Scotland international rugby union player

- Born: Robert Donaldson Hamish Bryce; 12 November 1941 (age 85) Scotland

Rugby union career
- Position: Prop
Amateur team(s)
Years	Team	Apps	(Points)
- London Scottish
Provincial / State sides
Years	Team	Apps	(Points)
- Anglo-Scots
International career
Years	Team	Apps	(Points)
1971-72	Scotland 'B'	2	
1973	Scotland	1	(0)

Hamish Bryce (born 12 November 1941) is a former Scotland international rugby union player. and business man.

== Rugby union career ==
=== Amateur career ===
He played for London Scottish, Bristol Rugby Club, as well as the Captain of the Combined Services and the Barbarians.

=== Provincial career ===
He played for the Anglo-Scots district side.

=== International career ===
He was capped twice by Scotland 'B', from 1971 to 1972.

He went on to secure his first and only senior international cap for Scotland in 1973, coming on as a replacement prop against Ireland.

== Business career ==
Bryce received a Bachelor of Mechanical Sciences from Cambridge University in 1966. He joined the British Army and was in the Royal Engineers.

He was chairman of TLG plc, formerly the Thorn Lighting Group. He was appointed chief executive of Thorn Lighting in 1986, led the buyout from Thorn EMI in 1993, appointed chairman of the Group when it was floated in 1994. The Queen came to visit their Spennymoor Factory in 1995, along with the then leader of the Opposition Rt Hon Tony Blair.

He was also Chair of the London Business Resilience Group

He was a member of the Design Council, whose purpose is to improve prosperity in the UK by enabling the best use of design in a modern global economy. It is a public body sponsored by the Department of Trade and Industry working across the public and private sectors.
