= David Gray (rugby union) =

Scotland international rugby union player

- Born: David Gray; 28 March 1953 Kilmarnock, Scotland
- Died: 2 April 2009 (aged 56) Ayr, Scotland
- Height: 6 ft 8 in (2.03 m)
- Weight: 112.5 kg (248 lb; 17 st 10 lb)

Rugby union career
- Position: Lock
Amateur team(s)
Years	Team	Apps	(Points)
- Kilmarnock
–	West of Scotland		
Provincial / State sides
Years	Team	Apps	(Points)
- Ayrshire
-	Glasgow District		
International career
Years	Team	Apps	(Points)
1978	Scotland 'B'	1	
1978-81	Scotland	9	(0)

David Gray (28 March 1953 – 2 April 2009) was a former Scotland international rugby union player.

== Rugby Union career ==
=== Amateur career ===
He played rugby at Kilmarnock Academy before playing for Kilmarnock.

He then played for West of Scotland.

=== Provincial career ===
He played for Ayrshire.

He played for Glasgow District. He was part of the Glasgow side that shared the 1974–75 Scottish Inter-District Championship with North and Midlands.

=== International career ===
He was capped by Scotland 'B' once, in 1978, against Italy 'B'.

He went on to receive 9 full senior caps for Scotland.

== Civil Service career ==
He was a planner with South Ayrshire Council. One of his remits was mapping and opening up pathways; to ensure that the public had access to the countryside.

== Death ==
Gray enjoyed pushing his body; and he completed the 205 mile Great Outdoors trek from Knoydart to the East Coast of Scotland in 2008. He was completing a training run at Dam Park, Ayr for the 2009 event when he died just as he was crossing the finish line. It was believed he suffered a massive heart attack.
