= Tim Exeter =

Scotland international rugby union player

- Born: March 1965 (age 61)
- School: Eltham College
- Occupation: Fitness coach

Rugby union career
- Position: Centre
Amateur team(s)
Years	Team	Apps	(Points)
- Moseley
Provincial / State sides
Years	Team	Apps	(Points)
1987	Anglo–Scots		
International career
Years	Team	Apps	(Points)
-	Scotland U21		
1987	Scotland	1	(0)
1987	Scotland 'B'	1	(0)
Coaching career
- Years: Team
- -: Richmond (Strength & Conditioning)
- -: Northampton Saints (Strength & Conditioning)
- -: CA Brive (Strength & Conditioning)

Tim Exeter (born March 1965) is a former Scotland international rugby union player. He became a Strength and Conditioning Coach and is now a director of a fitness business.

== Early life ==
Exeter was educated at Eltham College in London, the same school that produced Eric Liddell.

== Rugby Union career ==
=== Amateur career ===
Based in England, Exeter was a strongly–built centre and played for the Birmingham club Moseley.

=== Provincial career ===
Exeter played for the Anglo–Scots team against France in 1987 and contributed a try in a winning cause.

=== International career ===
He was a Scotland under 21s representative player and retrospectively received a full international cap for an appearance with a Scotland XV against France at Netherdale in November 1987. He didn't get any further senior international opportunities, but did train with the national squad in the 1990–91 season.

As the senior cap was retrospectively awarded later, at the time he was still eligible for the Scotland 'B' side which was purely for those without a full cap. So he played for Scotland 'B' against Italy 'B' on 5 December 1987 in an unanswered seven try romp for the Scots.

=== Coaching career ===
A broken neck ended his playing career at the age of 24. He became a Strength and Conditioning Coach and worked with Richmond RFC.

He was a Strength and Conditioning Coach for Northampton Saints. He pioneered the use of the Myotruk resistance unit there.

He moved to be a Strength and Conditioning Coach for CA Brive.

== Business career ==
Exeter works in Leamington Spa as a fitness coach. He is a director of Megabox Fitness.

== See also ==
- List of Scotland national rugby union players
