= Jim Hay (rugby union) =

Scotland international rugby union player & coach

- Born: James Allan Hay; 8 August 1964 (age 62) Hawick, Scotland

Rugby union career
- Position: Hooker
Amateur team(s)
Years	Team	Apps	(Points)
- Hawick
Senior career
Years	Team	Apps	(Points)
1996	Border Reivers		
Provincial / State sides
Years	Team	Apps	(Points)
- South of Scotland
International career
Years	Team	Apps	(Points)
1989	Scotland 'B'	2	
1995	Scotland	1	(0)
Coaching career
- Years: Team
- 1999-2000: Gala
- 2008: Hawick

Jim Hay (born 8 August 1964) is a former Scotland international rugby union player. He played as hooker.

== Rugby Union career ==
=== Amateur career ===
He played for Hawick. He made his senior debut aged 16.

=== Provincial and professional career ===
He played for and captained the South of Scotland district side.

When the Scottish rugby union game turned professional in 1996, Hay signed a professional SRU contract. He then played for the Border Reivers.

=== International career ===
Hay was capped by Scotland 'B' on 18 February 1989 to play against France 'B'.

He received his only senior cap in 1995 against Samoa on 18 November at Murrayfield Stadium.

=== Coaching career ===
He coached Gala. He resigned in 2000, after only a year in the role.

He coached Hawick but was sacked in 2008.

== Media career ==
He was a rugby union commentator for Scottish Television.

== Business career ==
He now runs an estate agents in Hawick.
