= Peter Jones (rugby union, born 1963) =

Scotland international rugby union player

- Born: Peter Martin Jones; 28 December 1963 (age 62) Arbroath, Scotland
- Height: 1.80 m (5 ft 11 in)
- Weight: 99 kg (218 lb)
- School: Hucclecote Secondary School, Gloucester

Rugby union career
- Position: Prop
Amateur team(s)
Years	Team	Apps	(Points)
1982-1997	Gloucester		
Provincial / State sides
Years	Team	Apps	(Points)
1990-	Anglo-Scots		
International career
Years	Team	Apps	(Points)
1990-92	Scotland 'B'	2	(0)
1991-92	Scotland 'A'	2	(0)
1992	Scotland	1	(0)

Peter Jones (born 28 December 1963) is a former Scotland international rugby union player.

== Rugby union career ==
=== Amateur career ===
He played for Gloucester.

=== Provincial career ===
He played for Anglo-Scots district.

=== International career ===
He was capped by Scotland 'B' twice; against Ireland 'B' on 22 December 1990, and against France 'B' on 2 February 1992.

He was capped by Scotland 'A' twice; against Spain on 1991, and against Italy 1992.

He received one full senior cap by Scotland; against Wales on 21 March 1992.
