= Andrew MacDonald (rugby union) =

Scotland international rugby union player

Andy Macdonald
- Born: Andrew Edward Douglas Macdonald; 17 October 1966 (age 60) Nairn, Scotland

Rugby union career
- Position: Lock
Amateur team(s)
Years	Team	Apps	(Points)
- Loughborough Students
- Cambridge University
- Heriot's
Provincial / State sides
Years	Team	Apps	(Points)
- Southland
-	Anglo-Scots		
-	Edinburgh District		
International career
Years	Team	Apps	(Points)
1990-92	Scotland 'B'	3	(0)
1991-93	Scotland 'A'	6	(0)
1993	Scotland	1	(0)

Andy Macdonald is a former Scotland international rugby union player.

== Rugby Union career ==
=== Amateur career ===
MacDonald played for Loughborough Students before moving on to play for Cambridge University R.U.F.C. where he gained a blue playing in the Varsity Match in 1989.

He later played for Heriot's.

=== Provincial career ===
He played for Southland, a province in New Zealand.

He played for the Scottish Exiles in the Scottish Inter-District Championship.

When he moved to play for Heriots, he then turned out for Edinburgh District.

=== International career ===
He was capped by Scotland 'B' to play against France 'B' in 1990. He earned 3 'B' caps in total.

He was capped by Scotland 'A' to play against Spain in 1991. He earned 6 'A' caps in total.

Macdonald made his international debut on 20 November 1993 at Murrayfield in the Scotland vs New Zealand match. He was on the losing side in his only test match.

He toured with Scotland to USA/Canada (1991), Australia (1992) and the South Seas (1993).

He also represented the Barbarians 8 times including a drawn test match against Scotland in 1991.
