= Euan Kennedy =

Scotland international rugby union player

- Born: Alexander Euan Kennedy; 30 July 1954 (age 72) Edinburgh, Scotland

Rugby union career
- Position: Centre
Amateur team(s)
Years	Team	Apps	(Points)
- Watsonians
Provincial / State sides
Years	Team	Apps	(Points)
- Edinburgh District
-	Reds Trial		
International career
Years	Team	Apps	(Points)
1976-81	Scotland 'B'	2	
1983-84	Scotland	4	(4)

Euan Kennedy (born 30 July 1954 in Edinburgh, Scotland) is a former Scotland international rugby union player. He is the brother of the actor Gordon Kennedy.

== Rugby Union career ==
=== Amateur career ===
He played for Watsonians.

=== Provincial career ===
He played for Edinburgh District; and was part of the 1986–87 Scottish Inter-District Championship winning side.

He played for the Reds Trial side in their match against Blues Trial on 3 January 1987.

=== International career ===
He was capped by Scotland 'B', both times against France 'B', in 1976 and 1981.

He was capped for Scotland 4 times, scoring 1 try; against England at Murrayfield. He was part of 1984 Scotland team that won the Grand Slam of the Five Nations Championship.

=== Administrative career ===
He was a committee member of Watsonians at the time when the club entered the Super 6.

He became the President of Watsonians in 2019, a position previously held in the past by his father.
