= Alex Brewster =

Scotland international rugby union player

- Born: Alexander Kinloch Brewster; 3 May 1954 (age 72) Dechmont, West Lothian, Scotland

Rugby union career
Amateur team(s)
Years	Team	Apps	(Points)
- Stewart's Melville
Provincial / State sides
Years	Team	Apps	(Points)
-	Edinburgh District		
-	Reds Trial		
International career
Years	Team	Apps	(Points)
1977−86	Scotland	6	(0)

Alexander Kinloch Brewster (born 3 May 1954) is a former rugby union player who gained six caps for the Scotland national rugby union team. He played as a prop for Stewart's Melville RFC.

== Early life ==
Brewster was born on 3 May 1954 in Dechmont, West Lothian. He was educated at Melville College in Edinburgh.

== Rugby Union career ==
=== Amateur career ===
Brewster captained Stewart’s Melville FPs.

=== Provincial career ===
Brewster captained Edinburgh District.

He played for the Reds Trial side in their match against Blues Trial on 3 January 1987.

=== International career ===
Brewster's first international appearance was against England at Twickenham on 15 January 1977. This was his first as three caps as flanker. He returned to the international side in 1985 as tight head and won a further three caps, with his last cap playing against Romania at Bucharest on 29 March 1986.

He played a match for the Barbarians in 1988. He captained the Scotland team that toured Japan in 1989 although full caps were not awarded.
