= Hawick Harlequins RFC =

Scottish rugby union club, based in Hawick

(Scotland) Hawick Harlequins RFC
- Full name: Hawick Harlequins Rugby Football Club
- Union: Scottish Rugby Union
- Nickname: Mighty Quins
- Founded: 1930; 96 years ago
- Location: Hawick, Scotland
- Ground: Wilton lodge Park
- Coach: Neil Douglas - Fred Stevenson - Ricki Kiore
- League: East Division Two
- 2025–26: East Division Two, 4th of 7

Hawick Harlequins Rugby Football Club are a Scottish Rugby Union team. Based in Hawick, Scotland they play in the East Regional Leagues. They also played at Murrayfield Stadium in 2002 when they reached the final of the BT Bowl competition, losing to Ellon RFC.

== Notable players ==
- Jim Renwick, capped 52 times for Scotland

== See also ==
- Hawick RFC
