= James Burnett (rugby union) =

Scotland international rugby union player

- Born: James Niven Burnett; 12 July 1947 (age 79) Kilmarnock, Scotland

Rugby union career
- Position: Prop
Amateur team(s)
Years	Team	Apps	(Points)
- Heriot's
Provincial / State sides
Years	Team	Apps	(Points)
- Edinburgh District
International career
Years	Team	Apps	(Points)
1978-80	Scotland 'B'	3	
1980	Scotland	4	(0)

James Burnett (born 12 July 1947) is a former Scotland international rugby union player.

== Rugby Union career ==
=== Amateur career ===
Burnett played for Heriot's.

=== Provincial career ===
He played for Edinburgh District.

=== International career ===
He received 3 Scotland 'B' caps between 1978 and 1980.

He went on to play for Scotland 4 times, all in 1980.

== Dental career ==
He became a dentist.
