= Keith Murray (rugby union) =

Scotland international rugby union player (born 1962)

- Born: Keith Tony Murray; 23 March 1962 (age 64) Hawick, Scotland

Rugby union career
- Position: Centre
Amateur team(s)
Years	Team	Apps	(Points)
- Hawick Trades
- Hawick
Provincial / State sides
Years	Team	Apps	(Points)
- South of Scotland
International career
Years	Team	Apps	(Points)
1984–85	Scotland 'B'	2	
1985	Scotland	3	(0)

Keith Murray (born 23 May 1962) is a former Scotland international rugby union player.

== Rugby Union career ==
=== Amateur career ===
He played for Hawick Trades, before moving to play for Hawick.

=== Provincial career ===
He played for South of Scotland District.

=== International career ===
He was capped twice for Scotland 'B', the first cap against Ireland 'B' on 1 December 1984.

He played for Scotland. He was capped three times in 1985.
