= Iwan Tukalo =

Scotland international rugby union player

- Born: Iwan Tukalo; 5 March 1961 (age 65) Edinburgh, Scotland
- Height: 5 ft 9 in (1.75 m)
- Weight: 11 st 13 lb (76 kg)

Rugby union career
- Position: Wing
Amateur team(s)
Years	Team	Apps	(Points)
- Royal HSFP
- Selkirk
Provincial / State sides
Years	Team	Apps	(Points)
- Edinburgh District
- South of Scotland
1984	Whites Trial		
1985-87	Blues Trial		
1988	Reds Trial		
International career
Years	Team	Apps	(Points)
1982-85	Scotland 'B'	5	
1985–92	Scotland	37	(60)
1990	Scotland 'A'	1	
Coaching career
- Years: Team
- Heriots

Iwan Tukalo (born 5 March 1961) is a Scottish former rugby union player who played as a wing. He earned 37 caps for the Scotland national team between 1985 and 1992.

== Rugby Union career ==
=== Amateur career ===
The son of a Ukrainian father and Italian mother, Tukalo was educated at the Royal High School, Edinburgh. He went on to play for Royal HSFP.

Tukalo then moved to play for Selkirk.

=== Provincial career ===
Tukalo played for Edinburgh District in the Scottish Inter-District Championship.

On moving to Selkirk, Tukalo then played for South of Scotland.

Tukalo played for the Whites Trial side on 7 January 1984.

The following year Tukalo moved up in contention and played for the Blues Trial side in their first match against the Reds Trial side. He was selected for Blues again in 1986, the Reds winning that match. In the subsequent fixture on 3 January 1987, he was again named in the Blues side against the Reds - and scored the Blues first try.

In January 1988 Tukalo first played for the Reds Trial side.

=== International career ===
Tukalo was capped by Scotland 'B' to play against France 'B' on 7 February 1982. He secured 5 'B' caps in total.

Tukalo won his first cap against Ireland and his last against Australia. He scored a total of 15 tries during his international career.

Tukalo won 37 caps for his country between 1985 and 1992. He was part of the Grand Slam winning team in 1990.

Tukalo has a solitary Scotland 'A' cap which he obtained in the 'A' side's first match, against Spain in 1990.

=== Coaching career ===
Tukalo coached the Heriots side in the Scottish Premiership Division One and is currently not involved with rugby at senior level.
