= Drew Gill =

Scotland international rugby union player

- Born: Andrew Davidson Gill; 30 August 1949 (age 77)

Rugby union career
- Position: Wing
Amateur team(s)
Years	Team	Apps	(Points)
- Gala
Provincial / State sides
Years	Team	Apps	(Points)
- South of Scotland
-	Scotland Possibles		
International career
Years	Team	Apps	(Points)
1972	Scotland 'B'	1	(0)
1973-74	Scotland	5	(8)

Drew Gill (born 30 August 1949) is a former Scotland international rugby union player.

== Rugby Union career ==
=== Amateur career ===
He played for Gala.

He was part of the Gala side that won the Border League in 1967, the first Gala side to do so since 1921.

He was part of the Gala 7s side that won the Gala Sevens in 1969 beating Loughborough Colleges in the final; and in 1970, beating Llanelli in the final.

The Gala 7s side of Ken Oliver, Peter Brown, Johnny Brown, Dunc Paterson, Arthur Brown, John Frame and Drew Gill were a notable side. Nicknamed the magnificent seven the Gala 7s won 16 Sevens tournaments between 1970 and 1972.

=== Provincial career ===
He played for South of Scotland District.

He played for Scotland Possibles in 1975.

=== International career ===
He was capped by Scotland 'B' against France 'B' in 1972.

His first full senior cap was against a Presidents XV to mark the SRU's centenary year in 1973. He played for Scotland a further four times, in the 1974 Five Nations Championship.
