= Tom Smith (rugby union, born 1953) =

Scotland international rugby union and basketball player (born 1953)

- Born: Thomas John Smith; 31 August 1953 (age 73) Macmerry, Scotland
- Height: 6 ft 8 in (2.03 m)

Rugby union career
- Position: Lock
Amateur team(s)
Years	Team	Apps	(Points)
1979-	Gala		
Provincial / State sides
Years	Team	Apps	(Points)
-	South of Scotland		
-	Whites Trial		
International career
Years	Team	Apps	(Points)
1981-82	Scotland 'B'	2	
1983-85	Scotland	4	(4)
- Basketball career

Career history
- 1976-79: Dalkeith Saints
- 1976-79: Scotland (26 caps)

Tom Smith (born 31 August 1953) is a former Scotland international rugby union player, and a former Scotland international basketball player.

== Rugby Union career ==
=== Amateur career ===
Smith played for Gala.

=== Provincial career ===
Smith played for South of Scotland in the Scottish Inter-District Championship.

Smith played for Whites Trial side against Blues Trial side on 3 January 1981.

=== International career ===
Smith was capped by Scotland 'B' on 7 March 1981 to play against France 'B'.

Smith made his full senior Scotland debut in 1983 against England, scoring a try in the match. He was to amass 4 caps in total for the senior side.

== Basketball career ==
=== Amateur career ===
Smith was a late convert to rugby union, only taking up the game at the age of 26. He started sports playing football as a goalkeeper. Due to his stature his team-mates entered him in the search of Scotland's tallest keeper. He was then spotted by the basketball side Dalkeith Saints and played for them.

=== International career ===
Smith was capped 26 times for the Scotland basketball team.
