= Sandy Carmichael =

Scottish rugby union player (1944–2021)

Sandy Carmichael MBE
- Born: Alexander Bennett Carmichael; 2 February 1944 Glasgow, Scotland
- Died: 27 October 2021 (aged 77) Kilbarchan, Scotland
- Height: 6 ft 2 in (1.88 m)
- Weight: 98 kg (216 lb)

Rugby union career
- Position: Prop
Amateur team(s)
Years	Team	Apps	(Points)
-	West of Scotland		
Provincial / State sides
Years	Team	Apps	(Points)
-	Glasgow District		
International career
Years	Team	Apps	(Points)
1969–79	Scotland	50	
1971, 1974	British and Irish Lions		

Alexander Bennett Carmichael MBE (2 February 1944 – 27 October 2021) was a Scottish rugby union international forward. The first player to earn 50 caps for Scotland, the tighthead prop was selected for two Lions tours.

== Rugby Union career ==
=== Amateur career ===
Raised in Newton Mearns, Carmichael was a tighthead prop and part of the West of Scotland side in the 1970s – a powerhouse in UK rugby, averaging 10 internationalists in the team per season, and dominating the domestic league with West's great rivals, Hawick RFC. Carmichael charged down a drop out and returned for a score in a memorable 32–6 victory against Hawick to win the league in 1973.

=== Provincial career ===
He played for Glasgow District.

He played for Scotland Possibles in the trial match of 11 January 1975.

=== International career ===
He earned 50 caps for Scotland from 1967 to 1978 which was a record for a Scottish player at the time.

He played for the British and Irish Lions on the 1971 tour to New Zealand, but was invalided out of the tour in Canterbury, after multiple punches by the opposition fractured his cheekbone.

Carmichael also went on the 1974 tour to South Africa, but did not make the test side.

==== Canterbury Incident ====
Carmichael was mainly remembered for being the victim of violence in the 1971 tour where he received five fractures of the cheekbone, yet still played until final whistle. The match was described as an extremely violent match and often referred to as the 'Battle of Canterbury'. The referee at one point told the captains that from that moment onwards he was going to follow the ball and it was up to them to sort out anything else.

Carmichael had to leave the tour following the Canterbury match, as did three other players including Ray McLoughlin the loose head prop. In this one game the Lions lost both of their first choice props. The second string of Ian McLauchlan who was already in the Lions squad and Sean Lynch stepped into the breach and proved very effective; even though the Lions lost some of the options that McLoughlin and Carmichael would have given them. The Lions intended test front row, which included John Pullin of England, came together again for the Barbarians in the famous match against the All Blacks in January 1973.

== Honours ==
He was awarded an MBE in the 1977 Silver Jubilee and Birthday Honours.

== Personal life ==
Carmichael was the grandson of Alec Bennett who played football for Celtic, Rangers and Scotland in the early 20th century.

He died on 27 October 2021, at the age of 77.
