= Gordon Dickson (rugby union) =

Scotland international rugby union player

- Born: Gordon Dickson; 10 December 1954 (age 71) Galashiels, Scotland
- Height: 1.91 m (6 ft 3 in)

Rugby union career
- Position: Flanker
Amateur team(s)
Years	Team	Apps	(Points)
- Gala
Provincial / State sides
Years	Team	Apps	(Points)
- South of Scotland
International career
Years	Team	Apps	(Points)
1977-78	Scotland 'B'	3	(0)
1978-82	Scotland	9	(4)

Gordon Dickson (born 10 December 1954) is a former Scotland international rugby union player.

== Rugby Union career ==
=== Amateur career ===
He played for Gala.

He broke his leg playing for Gala, just weeks before his wedding; and so he had to hobble down the church aisle with a cast on his leg. His wife was a Scotland international hockey player.

The couple later moved to Western Australia.

=== Provincial career ===
He played for South of Scotland District.

=== International career ===
He was capped by Scotland 'B' 3 times, between 1977 and 1978.

His first full senior cap was New Zealand in 1978. He was capped a total of 9 times.
