= Alister Campbell (rugby union, born 1959) =

Scotland international rugby union player

- Born: Alister James Campbell; 1 January 1959 (age 67) Hawick, Scotland

Rugby union career
- Position: Lock
Amateur team(s)
| Years | Team | Apps | (Points) |
| 1975-76 | Hawick Linden | | |
| 1976- | Hawick | | |
Provincial / State sides
| Years | Team | Apps | (Points) |
- South of Scotland
International career
| Years | Team | Apps | (Points) |
| 1983-84 | Scotland 'B' | 3 | |
| 1984-88 | Scotland | 15 | (0) |
Coaching career
- Years: Team
- Hawick PSA

Alister James Campbell (born 1 January 1959) is a former Scotland international rugby union player.

== Rugby Union career ==
=== Amateur career ===
He started out playing for Hawick Linden in 1975.

He played for Hawick from 1976. He played as a Lock.

He captained the side in 1987–88 season.

=== Provincial career ===
He played for South of Scotland District.

=== International career ===
He was capped by Scotland 'B' 3 times in the period 1983–84.

He received 15 full senior caps for Scotland between 1984 and 1988. He made his debut beating Ireland to win the Triple Crown; two weeks later he was in the side that won the Grand Slam in 1984.

=== Coaching career ===
He coached Hawick PSA; and they won the semi-junior league in 1994–95 season.
