= Norman Pender =

Scotland international rugby union player (1948–2021)

- Born: Norman Ewart Ker Pender; 1 February 1948 Bridlington, England, U.K.
- Died: 24 August 2021 (aged 73)

Rugby union career
- Position: Prop
Amateur team(s)
Years	Team	Apps	(Points)
- Hawick Trades
–	Hawick		
Provincial / State sides
Years	Team	Apps	(Points)
- South of Scotland
International career
Years	Team	Apps	(Points)
1975-77	Scotland 'B'	3	
1977–78	Scotland	4	(0)

Norman Ewart Ker Pender (1 February 1948 – 24 August 2021) was a Scotland international rugby union player. After rugby, he became a Liberal Democrat councillor. He was found guilty of sexual assault in 2014. He died from a suspected heart attack in August 2021, at the age of 73.

== Rugby Union career ==
=== Amateur career ===
Pender played club rugby for Hawick Trades and then Hawick.

=== Provincial career ===
Pender was capped by South of Scotland District.

=== International career ===
Pender was capped for Scotland 'B' three times between 1975 and 1977.

He earned four caps for Scotland.

== Political career ==
Pender was a councillor for the Liberal Democrats on the Scottish Borders Council between 1998 and 2003.

== Indecent behaviour ==
Pender was charged with rape in October 2013, and was found guilty of three charges of lewd and libidinous behavior, and one charge of sexual assault in December 2013. The rape charge was not proven.

He was jailed for six years in 2014 and placed on the sex offenders’ register.

In 2018, he was sued for £650,000 in damages by one of the victims.
