= George Mackie (rugby union) =

Scotland international rugby union player (1949–2020)

- Born: George Yuill Mackie; 19 April 1949 Aberdeen, Scotland
- Died: 3 April 2020 (aged 70) Nazeing, England
- Height: 1.96 m (6 ft 5 in)
- Weight: 95.4 kg (210 lb; 15 st 0 lb)

Rugby union career
- Position: No. 8
Amateur team(s)
Years	Team	Apps	(Points)
- Montrose
–	Highland		
Provincial / State sides
Years	Team	Apps	(Points)
- North and Midlands
International career
Years	Team	Apps	(Points)
1974	Scotland 'B'	1	
1975-78	Scotland	4	(0)

George Yuill Mackie (19 April 1949 – 3 April 2020) was a Scotland international rugby union player.

== Rugby Union career ==
=== Amateur career ===
He first joined an Aberdeen club called 'the Hairies'; before joining an established team Montrose.

He then moved to Highland club in Inverness. He was the only player capped by Scotland while representing Highland for all his caps. Colin Baillie, who coached him at the club, stated:

He was an extraordinary ball player, great with his hands and he could run all day. He was one of the fittest boys I worked with. He led by example and was always there. On the pitch he would do any task and off the field he was the same. He did what some might have regarded as mediocre jobs, working as a janitor or in a distillery and he never took defeat easily.

=== Provincial career ===
Mackie played for North and Midlands.

=== International career ===
He played for Scotland 'B' against France 'B' in 1974.

Mackie played for the Scotland national rugby union team between 1975 and 1978 and took part in the 1975 Scotland rugby union tour of New Zealand.

== Political career ==
Outside rugby Mackie was a local councillor for Nazeing in Essex, England. He ran for the Bumble's Green ward in Nazeing in 1987 as a Labour candidate.

== Farming career ==
He had a 500 acre farm in Nazeing inherited from his father. He sold Christmas trees when in season and logs the rest of the year.

== Family ==
His father, John Mackie, was a Labour MP who went into the House of Lords. and who bought the farm in Essex while MP for Enfield East. His uncle, George Mackie, Baron Mackie of Benshie, was Baron Mackie of Benshie, a Liberal Democrat peer. Another uncle was Sir Maitland Mackie.

His wife Catherine was a journalist, a former political editor of the Glasgow Herald; and adviser to Alistair Darling in the Treasury.

He had 2 sons, Robert and Hector. Robert is now in the Treasury, while Hector runs the farm.

== Death ==
Mackie was diagnosed with pancreatic cancer and died from the illness.
