= Ian Lambie =

Scotland international rugby union player

- Born: Ian Kerr Lambie; 13 April 1954 (age 72) Edinburgh, Scotland

Rugby union career
- Position: No. 8
Amateur team(s)
Years	Team	Apps	(Points)
- Watsonians
Provincial / State sides
Years	Team	Apps	(Points)
- Edinburgh District
International career
Years	Team	Apps	(Points)
1976-78	Scotland 'B'	2	
1978-79	Scotland	4	(0)

Ian Lambie (born 13 April 1954) is a former Scotland international rugby union player.

== Rugby Union career ==
=== Amateur career ===
He played for Watsonians.

=== Provincial career ===
He played for Edinburgh District.

=== International career ===
He was capped by Scotland 'B' twice against France 'B' from 1976 to 1978.

He played for Scotland four times, from 1978 to 1979.
