= Jim Renwick =

British Lions & Scotland international rugby union player

- Born: James Menzies Renwick; 12 February 1952 (age 74) Hawick, Scotland
- School: Hawick High School

Rugby union career
- Position: Centre
Amateur team(s)
| Years | Team | Apps | (Points) |
- Hawick Harlequins
| – | Hawick | | |
Provincial / State sides
| Years | Team | Apps | (Points) |
- South of Scotland
| - | Scotland Probables | | |
International career
| Years | Team | Apps | (Points) |
| 1971 | Scotland 'B' | 1 | |
| 1972–84 | Scotland | 52 | (67) |
| 1980 | British & Irish Lions | 1 | (0) |

Jim Renwick (born 12 February 1952) is a former Scotland international rugby union player. He played at Centre.

== Rugby Union career ==
=== Amateur career ===
He played for Hawick Harlequins and then moved to play for Hawick.

=== Provincial career ===
He played for South of Scotland.

He played for Scotland Probables in 1975.

=== International career ===
He was capped by Scotland 'B' against France 'B' in 1971.

He earned 52 full senior caps for Scotland.

Allan Massie thinks his 1981–82 international season was his best, and describes him as "an individualist rather than a link-man" and that

"Indeed, he was often at his most dangerous collecting bad ball, when his ability to accelerate from a standing start, jinking and weaving and ducking under tackles, enabled him to split defences whose wit was not as sharp as his. Renwick was also a fine and consistent place-kicker – although rarely used at international level – a good, if one-footed, kicker from hand, and an excellent drop-kicker (he scored drop-goals against both Wales and France in season 1981–82). Despite all this, his game was characterized by a willingness always to run the ball."

A player of precocious talent, Jim Renwick was aged nineteen when he won his first cap against France in 1972. It was the first of a then-record 52 appearances for Scotland, and scored eleven tries. He tended to be at his best when playing against Wales, scoring more tries against them than any other country.

Richard Bath writes of him:

"The bald pate of Hawick's Jim Renwick was one of the most familiar sights of the 1970s. Although the Borderer's lack of hair made him look a deal older, and at times he was overshadowed by the genius of John Rutherford, Renwick was no journeyman. Staunch in defence, it was in attack where he was at his most effective. A short man, he had the ability to wriggle through tackles and to consistently break the gain line. Renwick announced his presence on the international stage with a try on his debut against France".

Renwick was a slightly unorthodox player, and considered suspect in defence in the early part of his career – this saw him left out of the 1977 Lions – although appearances were deceptive. While Renwick never tackled in the classic style, few men got past him; he preferred a high, smothering tackle that also had the benefit of often allowing him to stay on his feet, and therefore stay in the game.

In Bucharest, in May 1984, Renwick broke Andy Irvine's previous record of 51 caps playing Romania, even though he had missed the first past of the season through injury.

Renwick was known for his unconventional appearance and playing style. Later in his career, he was bald, moustached, and slightly rotund, and was noted for running with his head nodding while using evasive movements to create space. He was primarily a right-footed kicker, had a comparatively weak left foot, and preferred to run with the ball.

He was dropped on the Lions tour, in favour of an English player.

Allan Massie thought his handling and evasion skills were marvellous:

"He had marvellous adhesive hands, and perhaps the quickest wit of any midfield player of recent years. Indeed he was often at his most dangerous when on the receiving end of a bad pass, for then his ability to dodge and accelerate abruptly from a standing start enabled him to split many defences. To see him run out of defence, jinking and swerving, the ball unusually high under his arm, was always exhilarating. He was very hard to put down, being powerful in the hips, and quick to slide under the high tackles with a shrug of his shoulders. Eels might envy his elusiveness."

Renwick retired at the beginning of the 1984 season, just before Scotland claimed its first grand slam since 1925.

== Family ==
He has 8 children, and is divorced to Shelagh (Duncan) and now in a long term relationship with Jane Gilligan.And also has 8 grandchildren.
