= Highland RFC =

Scottish amateur rugby union club, based in Inverness

Highland
- Full name: Highland Rugby Football Club
- Founded: 1922; 104 years ago
- Location: Inverness, Scotland
- Ground: Canal Park
- President: Roy Dinnes
- Coach: Davie Carson
- League: Scottish National League Division Two
- 2025–26: Scottish National League Division One, 3rd of 10
Team kit

Official website
- www.highlandrugbyclub.com

Highland Rugby Football Club is a rugby union amateur club from the city of Inverness that compete in the Scottish National League Division Two. They have a number of teams taken from different age groups including micros and minis, S1 and S2, Under-15, Under-16, Under-18 and senior first and second teams. They play their rugby at Canal park in Inverness.

== History ==
The club celebrated when they announced the appointment of a jointly funded development officer enabling the club to more actively grow rugby across all ages. The Canal Park Club demonstrated their commitment to the game, and the revised development structure, when they teamed up with Scottish Rugby and the Highland Council to fund the new post which brings thousands of pounds of investment into rugby in the area. Development Officers (DOs) are dedicated to recruiting and retaining rugby players, coaches, referees and volunteers in and around their local communities working continuously to create links between schools and clubs to maximise the opportunities to play rugby in their area. Their efforts were rewarded in the 2010–11 season when they were given the SRU club of the month award for November.

In 2020 Highland RFC launched a club lottery in association with Our Club Lotto which continues to help fund rugby development in Inverness. Draws take place every Wednesday night with all profits reinvested into the club and prizes up to £20,000 available to be won.

== Sides ==
=== 1st XV ===
The 1st XV have had a recent resurgence during the second decade of the 21st century, led by Coach Dave Carson, most notably winning the Scottish National League Division Three title in 2017–2018.

The 1st XV currently play in National Division one.

=== 2nd XV ===
Highlands 2nd XV also known as the Raptors currently play in Caledonia Division 2 Northwest after successfully winning Caledonia North 3 in 2015/16. This was the side's second promotion in two years, after winning Caledonia League Division 4 North the year before.

During the 2010–11 season the Highland raptors became champions in the Caledonia Division 2 Northwest league although they could not be considered for promotion due to them playing as a second XV side. Due to this, Moray RFC progressed to the play-off stage for a chance at promotion to Caledonia Division 1 in which they triumphed over Aberdeen Wanderers. The Raptors however still got the chance to become Division 2 champions by playing Aberdeen Wanderers, a game in which they also achieved success.

== Sevens ==
The club run the Inverness City Sevens. The club's sevens tournament was renamed in 2022. Formerly it was known as the Highland Sevens.

== Stadium ==
Canal Park
- Location: Inverness, Scotland
- Surface: 4G, formerly grass

Construction
- Groundbreaking: 1922
- Built: –1922
- Opened: 1922
- Renovated: 2017

Tenants
- Highland RFC (1922–present) Inverness Caledonian Thistle Youth Development (1994–present); Clachnacuddin F.C. (2020) Loch Ness F.C. (2020–2021)

The rugby club's ground, Canal Park, has been their home since their founding in 1922. Following their surge into higher levels of Rugby, their ground was upgraded in 2017 from grass to a 4G pitch, and the club house majorly improved upon. In 2020, local football club Clachnacuddin F.C., were put into a temporary groundshare agreement after a fire at their ground, Grant Street Park, on Christmas Eve 2019, in order to keep the Highland League running smoothly. On Clachnacuddin's opening game at Canal Park against Fort William F.C., they drew a crowd of approximately 700, which was a significant improvement on their usual attendance at Grant Street, however, Fort William won the game 1–0. It was used for a second time against Forres Mechanics F.C., in which Clachnacuddin lost 3–2.

The ground is often used by the youth and reserve teams of Inverness Caledonian Thistle.

== Notable players ==
- Moray Low, currently playing for Exeter Chiefs in the Aviva Premiership and internationally for Scotland. Before Exeter he played for Glasgow Warriors (2006–2014)
- John Barr – International shinty player
- Jamie Dobie – Glasgow Warriors
- Bruce Flockhart – Glasgow Warriors
- Jamie Gillan – Punter for Cleveland Browns in the NFL
- Patrick Kelly – Glasgow Warriors
- George Mackie – Scotland
- Ernie Michie – Scotland, British Lions
- Nairn McEwan, Scotland

== Honours ==
- Highland / Inverness City Sevens
  - Champions: 1932, 1953, 1974, 1975, 1976, 1977, 1979, 1980, 1981, 1985, 1991, 1994
- Scottish National League Division Three
  - Champions (1): 2017–18
- Caledonia League Division One
  - Champions (1): 2015–16
  - Runners-Up (1): 2014–15
- Scottish Rugby Shield
  - Runners-Up (1): 2015–16
- Inverness Craig Dunain Sevens
  - Champions: 1992
- Aberdeen Sevens
  - Champions: 1934
- Stornoway Sevens
  - Champions: 1977
- Lochaber Sevens
  - Champions: 1991
- Orkney Sevens
  - Champions: 1981
- Clarkston Sevens
  - Champions: 1976, 1977
- Caithness Sevens
  - Champions: 1969, 1970, 1973, 1975, 1980
- Ross Sutherland Sevens
  - Champions: 1966, 1978, 1984, 1985, 1994, 2022
- Moray Sevens
  - Champions: 1967, 1969, 1971, 1972, 1975, 1976, 1980, 1981, 1982, 1983, 1989
- Kirkcaldy Sevens
  - Champions: 1975, 1980, 1981
- Mull Sevens
  - Champions: 2023
- Kirkcaldy Sevens
  - Champions: 2024

=== Other honours ===
2015/16: 1st Xv Caledonia Shield Champions
2nd Xv Caledonia Division 3 North Champions
Andrew Findlater – Caledonia Leagues Player of the Season
Stevie Rutledge – Scottish Rugby Try of the Season
London Irish mini festival shield winners

2014/15: 2nd XV Caledonia League Division 4 Winners
1st XV 2nd place in Caledonia League 1

2013/14: 1st XV Caledonia North Division 2 Winners – undefeated season
1st XV Caledonia Bowl Winners
1st XV National Bowl Winners
Rory Cross – National Bowl Final Man of the Match
