= Bill Watson (rugby union) =

Scotland international rugby union player

- Born: William Sinclair Watson; 7 January 1949 (age 77) Edinburgh, Scotland

Rugby union career
- Position: No. 8
Amateur team(s)
Years	Team	Apps	(Points)
- Boroughmuir
Provincial / State sides
Years	Team	Apps	(Points)
- Edinburgh District
International career
Years	Team	Apps	(Points)
1971	Scotland 'B'	1	
1974-79	Scotland	10	(0)

Bill Watson (born 7 January 1949) is a former Scotland international rugby union player.

== Rugby union career ==
=== Amateur career ===
Watson played for Boroughmuir.

=== Provincial career ===
He played for Edinburgh District.

=== International career ===
Watson was capped by Scotland 'B' once against France 'B' in 1971.

He played for Scotland ten times, from 1974 to 1979. He was the Boroughmuir club's second Scotland international player (after Ken Ross in 1961).

=== Administrative career ===
Watson was a Director and then Chief Executive at the Scottish Rugby Union from 2000 to 2003. He was sacked as Chief Executive in 2003 as part of management shake-up. It came after under-performance from the national team and the professional clubs. Earlier that year Glasgow Warriors lost Jason White to Sale Sharks with Watson admitting that the Warriors could not compete with the English club in the cash stakes.

He was a Director at Boroughmuir from 2012 to 2019. He handed over the role of director of finance to Alice Shek in 2018, becoming vice president of the club.

It was while Watson was a director of the club that Boroughmuir instigated the Bill Watson Youth Rugby Bursary Programme. It was backed by the Microtech Group in a four-year deal. It was to cover all the costs of playing rugby for the youngsters, including touring. Watson stated:

I’m delighted that we can actively support the next generation of talented young people to get as much enjoyment out of rugby as I have, without any financial worries. The support from Microtech Group will go a long way in helping our young talent to fulfill their potential, whether that’s playing rugby for pleasure or going on to play the game professionally.

== Family ==
Watson's brother George Watson played as Lock. He also played at Boroughmuir and was capped by Edinburgh District. Unlucky not to receive a full senior cap for Scotland, he was named in Alan Lorimer's selection for Scotland's best uncapped team.
