= Jordanhill RFC =

Defunct Scottish rugby union club, based in Glasgow

(Scotland) Jordanhill RFC
- Full name: Jordanhill Rugby Football Club
- Union: Scottish Rugby Union
- Founded: 1921
- Disbanded: 1988; 38 years ago
- Location: Glasgow, Scotland
- Ground(s): Southbrae Drive, Jordanhill; Kilmardinny

Jordanhill Rugby Football Club was a rugby union football club based in Glasgow, Scotland. Founded as a club for the students and former students of Jordanhill College, it lasted until 1988 when it merged with Hillhead RFC to form Hillhead Jordanhill RFC.

== Jordanhill College ==
Jordanhill College was planned in 1913 as a teacher training college. On the outbreak of the First World War, the building of the campus was delayed but Jordanhill School was completed in 1920 and the teaching college was completed in 1921.

== Rugby ==
A rugby team, Jordanhill College RFC, was formed. The club used the campus grounds at Southbrae Drive in Jordanhill for their matches. Jordanhill College School Former Pupils RFC played their matches at Kilmardinny in Bearsden and Victoria Park, Jordanhill. The college and school teams merged in 1965.

== Merger ==
The club was merged with Hillhead RFC (formerly the rugby club of the former pupils of Hillhead High School) in 1988 to form Hillhead Jordanhill RFC.

== Club Honours ==
- Scottish Unofficial Championship
  - Champions: 1969
- Glasgow City Sevens
  - Champions: 1952, 1953, 1954
- Allan Glen's Sevens
  - Champions: 1975, 1979
- Lenzie Sevens
  - Champions: 1969, 1973
- Hillhead HSFP Sevens
  - Champions: 1976
- Glasgow University Sevens
  - Champions: 1974
- Kilmarnock Sevens
  - Champions: 1954
- Ayr Sevens
  - Champions: 1982
- Hyndland Sevens
  - Champions: 1969

== Notable former players ==
=== Former coaches ===
- Bill Dickinson, Scotland national rugby union coach, 1971–77.
- Richie Dixon, Scotland national rugby union coach 1995–98, Glasgow Warriors Head Coach 1999-2002
- (Scotland) Hugh Campbell, Glasgow Warriors Head Coach 2003-06

=== Scotland internationalists ===
- (Scotland) Ron Glasgow
- (Scotland) Ian McLauchlan
- (Scotland) Gordon Strachan
- (Scotland) Jim Carswell
- (Scotland) Richie Dixon

=== Glasgow District players ===
- (Scotland) J.H. Roxburgh
- (Scotland) J. MacLauchlan
- (Scotland) I. MacLauchlan
- (Scotland) Jim Carswell
- (Scotland) I. Cosgrove
- (Scotland) Richie Dixon
- (Scotland) C.S. Bisset
- (Scotland) P. Gallacher
- (Scotland) D.L. Turner
- (Scotland) W.J. Laurie
- (Scotland) J. Buchanan
- (Scotland) A.D. Armstrong
- (Scotland) Hugh Campbell
- (Scotland) Wes Wyroslawski
- (Scotland) B.A. Rankin
- (Scotland) J. Henderson
- (Scotland) J. Douglas
