= Keith Robertson (rugby union, born 1954) =

Scotland international rugby union player

- Born: Keith William Robertson; 5 December 1954 (age 71) Hawick, Scotland
- Notable relative: Mark Robertson (son)

Rugby union career
- Position: Wing/Centre
Amateur team(s)
| Years | Team | Apps | (Points) |
- Melrose
Provincial / State sides
| Years | Team | Apps | (Points) |
- South of Scotland
International career
| Years | Team | Apps | (Points) |
| 1978 | Scotland 'B' | 1 | (0) |
| 1978–89 | Scotland | 44 | (41) |

Keith William Robertson (born 5 December 1954 in Hawick, Scotland) is a former Scotland international rugby union player.

== Rugby Union career ==
=== Amateur career ===
Robertson played for Melrose.

Richard Bath writes of him that:

Keith Robertson never possessed the acceleration which usually marks out the great wings. Yet what he lacked in out-and-out pace he more than made up for in guile and sheer footballing ability. An accomplished Sevens player, the willowy Melrose wing – he was a shade under 11 stone – was also a prolific try scorer at every level except international. During his Scotland career which spanned eleven years, Robertson only managed to score eight tries.

=== Provincial career ===
He played for South of Scotland.

=== International career ===
He played for Scotland 'B' on 19 March 1978.

He played for Scotland forty four times between 1978 and 1989. He played at both wing and centre, the latter twenty times out of his forty four caps.

Keith Robertson was a major part of Scotland's Grand Slam in 1984.

He was never selected for the British Lions.

== Media career ==
After retiring he became involved in Borders rugby, and was one of the major Scottish advocates of professionalism in rugby union.

He occasionally appears on STV's rugby programme.
