= Alan Tomes =

Scotland international rugby union player

- Born: Alan James Tomes; 6 November 1951 (age 75) Hawick, Scotland
- Height: 1.96 m (6 ft 5 in)
- Weight: 100 kg (220 lb; 15 st 10 lb)

Rugby union career
- Position: Lock
Amateur team(s)
Years	Team	Apps	(Points)
- Gateshead Fell
- Hawick
Provincial / State sides
Years	Team	Apps	(Points)
- South of Scotland
-	Scotland Probables		
International career
Years	Team	Apps	(Points)
1975	Scotland 'B'	1	
1976-87	Scotland	48	(12)

Alan Tomes (born 6 November 1951) is a former Scotland international rugby union player.

== Rugby Union career ==
=== Amateur career ===
Born in Hawick, Tomes moved to Gateshead when he was 8 years old. He played rugby for Gateshead Fell.

His grandfather, still in Hawick, told Robin Charters of his rugby loving grandson in the north-east of England.

Tomes recalls:

Dad got a phonecall from [club stalwart] Robin Charters: 'How big’s this boy of yours, Charlie?’ I was 6ft 5ins so I got asked up to Mansfield Park for a trial. Robin told me to go into the changing-room and introduce myself. Fourteen other guys wondered: 'Who’s this big bugger?’ I was a bit forward, calling myself a replacement for Jim Scott. Plus, Jim Renwick was in full flow with a funny story and I interrupted him. Not an auspicious first day!

He then played for Hawick.

=== Provincial career ===
He was capped by South of Scotland District.

He played for Scotland Probables on 11 January 1975.

=== International career ===
He was capped by Scotland 'B' against France 'B' in 1975.

He had 48 caps for Scotland.

He toured South Africa in 1980 with the British and Irish Lions.

He also played for the Barbarians. Tomes remembered:

I remember making a 50-yard break for the Barbarians and the attitude of my English colleagues was: 'Middle-rows just don’t do that.' England have never played a loose game whereas, bulk or no bulk, Scots have always wanted to have a go.
