= Ian McLauchlan =

Scottish rugby union player (1942–2025)

Ian McLauchlan OBE
- Born: John McLauchlan; 14 April 1942 Tarbolton, Scotland
- Died: 20 June 2025 (aged 83)
- Height: 1.76 m (5 ft 9 1/2 in)
- Weight: 92 kg (14 st 7 lb; 203 lb)
- University: Jordanhill College

Rugby union career
- Position: Prop
Amateur team(s)
Years	Team	Apps	(Points)
- Jordanhill
- West of Scotland
Provincial / State sides
Years	Team	Apps	(Points)
- Glasgow District
International career
Years	Team	Apps	(Points)
1969–1979	Scotland	43	(0)
1971–1974	British and Irish Lions	8	(3)

122nd President of the Scottish Rugby Union
- In office 2010–2012
- Preceded by: Jim Stevenson
- Succeeded by: Alan Lawson

John McLauchlan (14 April 1942 – 20 June 2025), known as Ian McLauchlan, was a Scotland international rugby union player who represented the British Lions on two tours. Nicknamed Mighty Mouse, he represented Scotland at loosehead prop from 1969 to 1979.

== Rugby union career ==
=== Amateur career ===
McLauchlan played for Jordanhill and West of Scotland.

His scrummaging and loose play were both of a high standard. Fellow West of Scotland and Scotland international player Gordon Brown rated him the best prop he had played alongside.

His nickname "Mighty Mouse" was from the fact that he was relatively small for a prop, but powerful for his size, like the cartoon character of the same name:

"Like McLeod, Ian McLauchlan was short and about as broad as a church door... There was always something a bit odd about his figure even before he acquired a certain rotundity that made him more like a French than a British prop. But nobody found him easy to prop against: he burrowed under the opposition."

=== Provincial career ===
McLauchlan played for Glasgow District.

=== International career ===
McLauchlan had to wait until second half of his twenties for a cap and played for another ten years before being dropped in 1979. He was capped 43 times for Scotland and was captain of the national side nineteen times (ten times of which Scotland won).

He captained the team in the Calcutta Cup match of 1973 despite breaking a bone in his leg two weeks before against Ireland, according to Massie "it says much for the persuasive power of his character that he convinced the selectors he was able to play."

Richard Bath writes:

"Certainly, McLauchlan was not the conventional size and shape for a loose-head prop in the 1970s, but in many ways it was precisely the combination of an amazing power to weight ratio plus his ability to get under the opposing tight-head that made him such an effective performer in the tight... As a larger than life character, he played best in the most intimidating circumstances... making him one of Scotland's most successful captains. After his retirement the Scottish Rugby Union showed their gratitude by banning him for publishing his autobiography".

On the Lions tour to New Zealand in 1971 he played in all four tests after Irish prop Ray McLoughlin broke his thumb punching Alex Wyllie in the notorious Battle of Canterbury the week before the first test.

He played in eight tests for the British Lions on the 1971 tour to New Zealand and the 1974 tour to South Africa, only once finishing on the losing side.

=== Administrative career ===
McLauchlan became the 122nd President of the Scottish Rugby Union. He served two years from 2010 to 2012.

== Personal life and death ==
McLauchlan was born on 14 April 1942 and was raised in Tarbolton. His father was a coal miner. He died on 20 June 2025, at the age of 83.
