= Roy Laidlaw =

British Lions & Scotland international rugby union player

- Born: Roy James Laidlaw; 5 October 1953 (age 73) Jedburgh, Scotland
- Height: 1.68 m (5 ft 6 in)
- Weight: 73 kg (161 lb; 11 st 7 lb)
- Notable relative(s): Clark Laidlaw, son Greig Laidlaw, nephew

Rugby union career
- Position: Scrum-half
Amateur team(s)
Years	Team	Apps	(Points)
- Jed-Forest
Provincial / State sides
Years	Team	Apps	(Points)
- Scottish Borders
-	South of Scotland		
International career
Years	Team	Apps	(Points)
1975-80	Scotland 'B'	7	
1980–88	Scotland	47	(28)
1983	British and Irish Lions	4	(0)
Coaching career
- Years: Team
- 1996: Scottish Districts

Roy James Laidlaw (born 5 October 1953) is a former Scotland international rugby union player. He played at Scrum-half and gained 47 caps for Scotland 1980–88 and played for British and Irish Lions in 1983.

== Rugby Union career ==
=== Amateur career ===
Much of his domestic rugby was played with Jed-Forest RFC, who were in the Scottish Second Division at the time.

=== Provincial career ===
He played for the Scottish Borders club side.

He was capped by South of Scotland District.

=== International career ===
Laidlaw came to prominence in the late 1970s due to a string of good performances for Scotland B, then managed by Jim Telfer.

Although he was first capped against Ireland in 1980, he didn't become a regular until 1981. Amongst the highlights of his career, were his two tries in the Triple Crown decider in Dublin, and when he scored a long range solo try against England.

He was an international reserve for three seasons, before getting capped again in 1980.

At the time, Dougie Morgan was holding down the scrum half position in the Scotland team, having displaced Alan Lawson. As Lawson refused to act as replacement, Laidlaw gained a place on the bench. When Morgan retired in 1979, the selectors brought back Lawson, with Laidlaw staying on the bench. Laidlaw continued his good form for Scotland B, and finally gained a place in the Scotland team in the 1980 season, having sat on the bench for 10 games without coming on as a replacement.

Writing during Laidlaw's international career in the mid-1980s, Allan Massie said that:

"Laidlaw's first quality is his courage. Only about 5 feet 6 inches tall and weighing 11 ½ stone, he never hesitates to absorb bad ball or to take on the enemy back row. I have never seen him shirk a tackle; he covers admirably and tirelessly... his game is not technically perfect. Though he often kicks admirably over his forwards' heads into the box, his kicking is not quite reliable and he can't really kick with his left foot. His pass, which has never been long, is faster than it was, but he is still inclined to skite the ball along the ground under pressure, and to take an indecisive step before passing. He depends a great deal on Rutherford to cover up these deficiencies; it was noticeable how his game went off in 1983 when Rutherford missed the first three championships."

In 1983, he became captain of Scotland, and his style was described as being like "Gareth Edwards rather than Jacques Fouroux." Massie added:

"With the possible exception of Jerome Gallion, Laidlaw is the most dangerous breaker from the scrum in contemporary Rugby. He doesn't have the strength of Terry Holmes, but he is faster and less predictable."

Jim Telfer, who was Scotland coach by that point, considered that Laidlaw's ability to break was Scotland's sharpest attacking weapon in the 1984 Grand Slam, settling the Ireland match in the first twenty minutes.

He was capped 47 times by Scotland.

==== Partnership with John Rutherford ====
Laidlaw partnered stand off John Rutherford a record 35 times for Scotland. As of 1988 this was a world record.

This has since been surpassed following Finn Russell and Greig Laidlaw (Roy's nephew) starting together in the final pool A game at the 2019 Rugby World Cup against Japan on 13 October 2019 in Yokohama.

Richard Bath comments:

"every country has, at some stage, a double-act which sees two players through sheer longevity, become mentioned in the same breath... One of the most enduring partnerships was that of Jed-Forest's Roy Laidlaw and Selkirk's John Rutherford. For nigh on a decade, the two were immovable at half-back for Scotland. Unlike most of the other famous pairings, however, it was Laidlaw and Rutherford's differences rather than their similarities, that melded them into an outstanding partnership. On the one hand, there was the peerless Rutherford, all grace and poise, who could glide through tackles and drill a ball onto a sixpence in the opposition's 22. On the other, there was Laidlaw, a gutsy fighter in the classic Borders mould. The pair played together on 35 occasions, a world record for a half-back partnership."

==== British and Irish Lions ====
Laidlaw gained a place in the test team on the 1983 British Lions tour to New Zealand, after the loss of first Terry Holmes and then Nigel Melville to injury, playing in all four tests. In total he played in a notably high number of games; 13 of the 18. He scored two tries on the tour and captained the Lions team twice, in the victories over West Coast and Wairarapa Bush.

=== Coaching career ===
He was Head Coach of the Combined Scottish Districts side in 1996 when they played Australia in November at McDiarmid Park. This was the last time that the combined Scottish Districts team played; their match with Australia organised before the SRU professionalised its 4 home-based district teams into the Glasgow Warriors, Edinburgh Rugby, Caledonia Reds and the Border Reivers.

In November 2025 he was inducted into Scottish Rugby's hall of fame.

== Personal life ==
Laidlaw's son Clark Laidlaw played and coached rugby, and his nephew Greig Laidlaw was selected 76 times for Scotland, also as a scrum-half.

Laidlaw announced on 21 October 2020 that he has dementia and that it may have been worsened by his rugby career.

He was appointed Honorary Captain of Jedburgh Golf Club in 2021.
