= Colin Deans =

Scotland international rugby union player

- Born: Colin Deans; 3 May 1955 (age 71) Hawick, Scotland
- School: Hawick High School

Rugby union career
- Position: Hooker
Amateur team(s)
Years	Team	Apps	(Points)
- Hawick Trades
- Hawick
Provincial / State sides
Years	Team	Apps	(Points)
- South of Scotland
International career
Years	Team	Apps	(Points)
1976-78	Scotland 'B'	3	
1978-87	Scotland	52	(8)
1986	British Lions	1	(0)

Colin Thomas Deans MBE (born 3 May 1955) is a former Scotland international rugby union player. A hooker, he played for Hawick and won 52 caps for Scotland, a record at the time. In 1986 he captained the British Lions against 'The Rest'.

== Career ==
He was born in Hawick in the Scottish borders. He played for Hawick Trades and then Hawick. His nickname was Beano. Deans attended the primary school in Hawick where Bill McLaren taught.

Deans recalled:

In Hawick we were born into rugby. It’s like New Zealand in its devotion to the game. And honestly, popping off to bed aged nine knowing that the next morning it would be my time to be coached by Mr McLaren was even more exciting than Christmas Eve. He asked each of us our names. 'Colin Deans, sir.' 'Peter Deans' laddie?’ 'Yes sir.' 'You’ll be a hooker then.'

Richard Bath wrote of him that he was:

The prototype for the faster hooker, acting as an extra flanker that has since emerged, Deans has few equals. Superb in the loose and a wonderfully quick striker of the ball in the scrum, the rugged Deans was also a pinpoint line-out thrower.

He was capped by South of Scotland District.

=== International ===
He was capped 3 times for Scotland 'B' between 1976 and 1978.

Deans made his Scotland debut at the age of 22 against France in 1978 when Scotland lost, 16 - 19. He was active on the national team between 1978 and 1987, with his high point being in Scotland's 1984 Grand Slam.

Allan Massie describes him as a hooker with back-row skills:

He is the most remarkable loose forward of any hooker I have seen. There can have been few, if any, faster; indeed, his speed is such that from the broken play and the line-out he gives Scotland in effect a fourth back-row forward. This means that, like Carmichael, he is ideal for the modern game, capable of fulfilling his specialist role, but also of taking a full part in fifteen-man Rugby. He harries the defence tirelessly: in the great win at Cardiff in 1982 Deans had a big part in the build-up for two of the Scottish tries; he was also at Calder's shoulder to take a pass, had that been necessary, when the first try was scored.

Massie also said that Deans was, "with the possible exception of Peter Wheeler, the most accurate thrower-in of recent years."

He won 52 caps for his country. He is said to have been most effective when playing in combination with David Leslie.

Noted for his skills at the line-out, of the game against Wales in 1984, the first Scottish Grand Slam since 1925, Allan Massie says "we would have probably lost that game if the Deans-Leslie combination had been less effective".

With 52 caps he overtook Frank Laidlaw's previous record.

Deans was selected for the 1983 British Lions tour to New Zealand, but despite playing well was an unused replacement for the 4 test matches. New Zealand thrashed the Lions 4–0 in the test series.
