= John Rutherford (rugby union) =

Scotland international rugby union player

- Born: John Young Rutherford; 4 October 1955 (age 71) Selkirk Scottish Borders

Rugby union career
- Position: Fly half
Amateur team(s)
Years	Team	Apps	(Points)
- Selkirk
Provincial / State sides
Years	Team	Apps	(Points)
- South of Scotland
International career
Years	Team	Apps	(Points)
1979–87	Scotland	42	(64)

John Young Rutherford (born 4 October 1955) is a former Scotland international rugby union player. His regular playing position was Fly half.

== Rugby Union career ==
=== Amateur career ===
Rutherford played for Selkirk.

Rutherford was nicknamed Rud or Ruddie.

=== Provincial career ===
Rutherford was capped by South of Scotland.

=== International career ===
Rutherford gained 42 caps at fly-half for Scotland between 1979 and 1987.

Richard Bath writes of him that:

"Outside Wales, perhaps only the Irish pair of Tony Ward and Ollie Campbell were able to hold a candle to fly-half John Rutherford, the man who dominated Scottish back play for most of the 1980s... Deceptively quick and a natural athlete, he was able to boot the ball prodigious distances or beat a man one-on-one, seemingly at will. Allied to a keen rugby intellect, Rutherford was Scotland's star turn throughout the 1980s."

Rutherford was a major figure in Scotland's 1984 Grand Slam.

In the warm up for the 1987 world cup he injured his knee in an unofficial game against Bermuda. He consequently didn't last long in the opening game for Scotland in the 1987 World Cup against France. This proved to be his last international appearance He partnered scrum-half Roy Laidlaw in 35 tests, at the time the record for any international half-back pairing.

Richard Bath writes of this partnership that:

"every country has, at some stage, a double-act which sees two players through sheer longevity, become mentioned in the same breath... One of the most enduring partnerships was that of Jed-Forest's Roy Laidlaw and Selkirk's John Rutherford. For nigh on a decade, the two were immovable at half-back for Scotland. Unlike most of the other famous pairings, however, it was Laidlaw and Rutherford's differences rather than their similarities, that melded them into an outstanding partnership. On the one hand, there was the peerless Rutherford, all grace and poise, who could glide through tackles and drill a ball onto a sixpence in the opposition's 22. On the other, there was Laidlaw, a gutsy fighter in the classic Borders mould. The pair played together on 35 occasions, a world record for a half-back partnership."

Rutherford was chosen to tour with the British and Irish Lions in 1983, being picked to play in the test team at inside centre.

Rutherford also played for the Rest of the World XV.

== Business career ==
After his exit from Scottish Rugby, John Rutherford went on to work in the financial sector, and direct a financial consultancy.

Rutherford is a Director of The Bill McLaren Foundation alongside Andy Irvine.
