= Scotland B national rugby union team =

Scotland B
- Union: Scottish Rugby Union
Team kit	Change kit

First international
- Scotland B 9–23 France B (1971)

Largest win
- Scotland B 37–0 Italy B (1987)

Largest defeat
- Scotland B 4–44 France B (1982)

The Scotland national B rugby union team was one of several national rugby union teams behind the Scottish national side. It was largely used as a development side and began in the era when Scotland had little in the way of an age-grade pathway.

It has now been disbanded - having been supplanted by the age-grade national teams; and the Scotland 'A' side. However the 'B' side was not the same as the 'A' side; and for a period between 1990 and 1992 Scotland ran both 'A' and 'B' international sides. Players such as Cameron Glasgow and Ian Jardine have 'A' and 'B' caps.

== History ==
The first Scotland 'B' match took place against France 'B' on 13 November 1971 and those continued throughout the 'B' side's history; and later more opposition arrived in the shape of Ireland 'B' and Italy 'B'. Scotland 'B' matches were Scotland's first attempt to be a development pathway for age-grade players; the Scotland Under 21 side played its first match in 1984. A 'B' cap was seen as a stepping stone to a full cap. After 1984, although losing its age-grade rationale, the Scotland 'B' side continued to run as a development side alongside the Under 21 and later age-grade sides; and was still seen as a stepping stone to a full cap.

No fully capped players were eligible for selection to the 'B' side.

The introduction of a Scotland 'A' side in 1990 [first played against Spain], alongside the age-grade pathway sides, meant that the remaining rationale of a 'B' side dwindled. The 'A' side was used as an official 'capture' side for securing residency or otherwise qualified players for Scotland's international selection, further increasing its usefulness.

The last Scotland 'B' international match took place in 1992. Again, it was against France 'B'.

In a weird twist, Scotland was to later field a Scotland Development XV between 1995 and 2002; indicating that the need for a development team outwith the 'A' side and age-grade sides remained necessary. However this Development XV side was not nominated a Scotland 'B' side. In 2024, Scotland started fielding an Emerging Scotland side, which was seen as a development side after the age grade pathway was exhausted and before an 'A' or senior cap.

== Selected teams ==
=== First match ===
The first Scotland 'B' match was against France 'B' on 13 November 1971 at Oyonnax, near the France - Switzerland border. Frances 'B' had already beat Wales 'B' 30 - 9. The Scots fared slightly better but were still beaten 23 - 9.

=== Dixon's run of success ===
The B team played on 18 February 1989 against France B.

The squad was:

M Wright (Kelso); D A Stark (Ayr), B Edwards (Boroughmuir), R R W Maclean (Gloucester), W L Renwick (London Scottish); D K Shiel (Jed-Forest), J M Scott (Stewart's Melville FP); D F Milne (Heriot's FP), J A Hay (Hawick), P H Wright (Borougmuir), D S Munro (Glasgow High Kelvinside), J F Richardson (Edinburgh Academicals), G E A Buchanan-Smith, C B S Richardson, captain, (both London Scottish), K P Rafferty (Heriot's FP). Replacements—I J Ramsey (Melrose), T J Exeter (London Scottish), S Jardine (South Glamorgan Institute), R I Wainwright (Edinburgh Academicals), D J D Buthcer (London Scottish), J G Runciman (Melrose).

It was coached then by Richie Dixon, at the time the coach of the Glasgow District side. It was reported in 1988 that Dixon had won Scotland B 5 out of their last 6 matches, including 2 France B matches

=== Last match ===
The last Scotland 'B' match to play [against France 'B'] saw these sides below face one another on 3 February 1992. Graham Young was the selector of the Scotland 'B' squad. Hugh Campbell was the forwards coach. Guy Laporte was the head coach of France 'B'.

FRANCE ■ S. Ougler, P. Salles. M Marsaing, H. Coufflgal, B. Lorenzin, D. Pouyau, J. Cazalbou, L. Annary [captain], J. Genet, R. Csespy, H. Mlorln, J. Gourrange. P. Chamayou, C. Oeslandes, M. Courtiols

SCOTLAND ■ M. Appleson (London Scottlsh), D. Stark (Ayr), D. Caskie (Gloucester), I. Jardine (Stirling County), M. Moncrieff (Gala), G. Townsend (Gala), D. Patterson (Edinburgh Acads), P. Jones (Gloucester), M. Scott (Dunfermline), B. Robertson (Stirling County), R. Scott (London Scottish), A. MacDonald (Heriot’s), S. Reid (Boroughmuir), D. McIntosh (Pontyprldd), R. Wainwrlght (Edinburgh Acads) [captain].

Referee: S. Pearcy (England).

France won the match 27 - 18.

== Unlucky 'B' caps ==
Several 'B' caps for Scotland were unlucky - whether through injury, illness, or just in an era where a more dominant player played in their position - not to go on a receive a full senior cap.

- Rodney Balfour (Glasgow HSFP)
- Ian Gray (West of Scotland)
- Stewart Hamilton (Stirling County)
- Richie Dixon (Jordanhill)
- Wes Wyroslawski (Jordanhill)
- Hugh McHardy (Kilmarnock)
- Brian Edwards (Boroughmuir)
- Niven Rose (Kilmarnock)

== See also ==
=== Men's National teams ===
==== Senior ====
- Scotland national rugby union team
- Scotland A national rugby union team
- Scotland national rugby sevens team

==== Development ====
- Scotland B national rugby union team
- Scotland Club XV
- Emerging Scotland

==== Age Grades ====
- Scotland national under-21 rugby union team
- Scotland national under-20 rugby union team
- Scotland national under-19 rugby union team
- Scotland national under-18 rugby union team
- Scotland national under-17 rugby union team
- Scotland national under-16 rugby union team

=== Women's National teams ===
==== Senior ====
- Scotland women's national rugby union team
- Scotland women's national rugby union team (sevens)
