= 2023–24 Scottish League Championship =

Rugby union Scottish league Championship

- Countries: Scotland
- Champions: Currie (3)
- Runners-up: Hawick
- Matches played: 93
- Tries scored: 726 (average 7.8 per match)

The 2023–24 Scottish League Championship, or 2023–24 Tennents League Championship for sponsorship reasons, is the 48th season of formal domestic rugby union leagues in Scotland.

The season began on September 2, 2023, with defending champions Hawick RFC playing Glasgow Hawks at their home pitch of Mansfield Park. Kelso RFC was promoted to the premier league to take the place of Glasgow Hutchesons Aloysians, who were relegated to National Division One.

Currie won their third Championship title and first in over 14 years, with Hawick finishing as runners up after a repeat of last season's final. Jed-Forest were relegated after finishing bottom.

The format was altered slightly from last season, with all Divisions having 10 teams as opposed to 2022-23 in which all but the Premiership division had 12 teams. In addition, a new fourth National Division was established with the bottom three teams competing in it being relegated to their respective Regional League Division 1.

== Premier Division ==
2023–24 Tennents Premiership Division Table
	Club	Played	Won	Drawn	Lost	Points For	Points Against	Points Difference	Try Bonus	Losing Bonus	Points	Notes
1	Hawick	18	16	1	1	617	259	358	11	0	77	Qualified to Playoffs
2	Marr	18	14	0	4	620	421	199	13	2	71	Qualified to Playoffs
3	Currie	18	12	1	5	616	341	275	13	2	65	Qualified to Playoffs
4	Kelso	18	9	3	6	476	451	25	9	2	53	Qualified to Playoffs
5	Heriot's	18	8	1	9	477	474	3	13	3	50	
6	Musselburgh	18	7	2	9	482	607	-125	12	3	47	
7	Edinburgh Academicals	18	7	1	10	470	437	33	10	6	46	
8	Glasgow Hawks	18	6	1	11	465	479	-14	8	5	39	
9	Selkirk	18	6	0	12	399	591	-192	8	3	35	
10	Jed-Forest	18	0	0	18	314	876	-562	4	1	5	Relegated

=== Statistics ===
Most tries Scored per team

- Currie (92)

Most tries scored per player

- Andrew Mitchell - Hawick (20)

Most points scored per team

- Marr (622)

Most points scored per player

- Kirk Ford - Hawick (245)

Most Yellow cards

- Currie (16)

Most Red cards

- Hawick (3)

=== Playoffs ===
Semi-finals
2 March – Mansfield Park
Hawick	25
Kelso	9
2 March – Fullarton Park
Marr	12
Currie	27

Final
4 May – Mansfield Park
Hawick	24
Currie	26

=== Semifinals ===
2 March 2024
15:00

Hawick	25-9	Kelso
Try: C Welsh 30' c McKean 45' c Redpath 80' c Con: Ford (2/3); Pen: Ford (2/2)		Pen: Patterson (3/3)

Mansfield Park
Referee: Rob McDowell

2 March 2024
15:00

Marr	12-27	Currie
Try: C Bickerstaff 10' c Sturgeon 80' c Con: Sturgeon (1/2)		Try: Davies 10' c Innes 20' c Cardosi 45' c McCaig 60' c Con: Brett (3/4); Pen: Brett (1/1)

Fullarton Park
Referee: Sam O’Neill

=== Finals ===
4 May 2024
14:00

Hawick	24-26	Currie

Mansfield Park

== National Division One ==
2023–24 Tennent's National League Division One Table
	Club	Played	Won	Drawn	Lost	Points For	Points Against	Points Difference	Try Bonus	Losing Bonus	Points	Notes
1	Ayr	18	15	0	3	721	419	302	13	1	74	Promoted
2	GHA	18	11	0	7	545	431	114	13	4	61	
3	Highland	18	11	1	6	465	359	106	9	1	56	
4	Watsonians	18	10	1	7	539	484	55	11	2	55	
5	Melrose	17	9	0	8	560	468	92	13	2	51	
6	Glasgow Academicals	17	9	0	8	554	475	79	12	3	51	
7	Biggar	18	6	1	11	503	575	-72	10	4	40	
8	Gala	18	7	0	11	492	576	-84	8	3	39	
9	Dundee	18	6	0	12	447	580	-133	8	1	33	
10	GHK	18	3	1	14	328	787	-459	5	2	21	Relegated

== National Division Two ==
2023–24 Tennent's National League Division Two Table
	Club	Played	Won	Drawn	Lost	Points For	Points Against	Points Difference	Try Bonus	Losing Bonus	Points	Notes
1	Peebles	15	12	1	2	472	278	194	11	1	62	Promoted
2	Falkirk	15	12	0	3	570	402	168	13	0	61	
3	Newton Stewart	17	11	2	4	434	340	94	8	1	57	
4	Lasswade	14	10	1	3	405	326	79	11	1	54	
5	Gordonians	15	8	0	7	406	291	115	8	3	43	
6	Stewart's Melville	15	6	1	8	411	471	-60	7	2	32	
7	Kirkcaldy	16	5	0	11	424	597	-173	8	2	30	
8	Stirling	14	4	0	10	391	439	-48	7	2	25	
9	Berwick	14	2	1	11	296	417	-121	6	4	20	
10	Aberdeen Grammar	15	2	0	13	295	543	-248	6	1	15	Relegated

1. Stewart's Melville where sanctioned 3 points on 7 October 2023 as per NCR 4.18.1, after their match against Falkirk had to be postponed due to insufficient players.

== National Division Three ==
2023–24 Tennent's National League Division Three Table
	Club	Played	Won	Drawn	Lost	Points For	Points Against	Points Difference	Try Bonus	Losing Bonus	Points	Notes
1	Preston Lodge	16	15	0	1	679	253	426	12	1	73	Promoted
2	Orkney	13	12	0	1	401	264	137	8	1	57	
3	Howe of Fife	16	9	1	6	579	423	156	12	4	54	
4	Allan Glen's	15	9	1	5	458	321	137	8	3	49	
5	Hillhead/Jordanhill	15	9	0	6	366	339	27	7	3	46	
6	Boroughmuir	15	7	0	8	475	419	56	10	3	41	
7	West of Scotland	15	5	0	10	371	468	-97	7	2	29	
8	Dumfries Saints	15	4	2	9	298	556	-258	6	2	28	
9	Cartha Queens Park	14	2	0	12	262	560	-298	4	3	15	
10	Hamilton	14	0	0	14	300	586	-286	6	4	10	Relegated

== National Division Four ==
2023–24 Tennent's National League Division Four Table
	Club	Played	Won	Drawn	Lost	Points For	Points Against	Points Difference	Try Bonus	Losing Bonus	Points	Notes
1	Garnock	13	13	0	0	632	167	465	12	0	64	Promoted
2	Whitecraigs	14	10	0	4	456	377	79	13	3	56	
3	Strathmore	12	9	0	3	428	284	144	9	1	46	
4	North Berwick	15	9	0	6	366	390	-24	8	1	42	
5	Stewartry	15	8	0	7	500	422	78	8	1	41	
6	Dunfermline	14	7	0	7	399	369	30	9	1	38	
7	Greenock Wanderers	14	6	0	8	348	459	-111	7	3	34	
8	Perthshire	14	3	0	11	357	520	-163	7	4	23	Relegated
9	Murrayfield Wanderers	14	2	0	12	339	563	-224	8	6	22	Relegated
10	Ross High	11	1	0	10	231	505	-274	4	3	11	Relegated

1. North Berwick where sanctioned 3 points on 14 October 2023 as per NCR 4.18.1, after their match against Garnock had to be postponed due to insufficient players.
