= 2022–23 Scottish League Championship =

Rugby union competition in Scotland

- Countries: Scotland
- Champions: Hawick (13)
- Runners-up: Currie

The 2022–23 Scottish League Championship, or 2022–23 Tennents League Championship for sponsorship reasons, was the 47th season of formal domestic rugby union leagues in Scotland.

The season was contested between August 2022 and March 2023, Hawick RFC won their 13th championship and their first in over 20 years whilst Currie where runners up for the second year running with Glasgow Hutchesons Aloysians being relegated to National Division One.

== Premier Division ==
2022–23 Tennents Premiership Division Table
	Club	Played	Won	Drawn	Lost	Points For	Points Against	Points Difference	Try Bonus	Losing Bonus	Points	Notes
1	Hawick	18	17	1	0	555	226	329	10	0	80	Qualified to Playoffs
2	Currie	18	14	0	4	619	396	223	10	2	72	Qualified to Playoffs
3	Edinburgh Academicals	18	13	0	5	513	362	151	12	2	66	Qualified to Playoffs
4	Marr	18	10	0	8	457	445	12	9	2	51	Qualified to Playoffs
5	Selkirk	18	9	1	8	374	357	17	5	3	46	
6	Jed-Forest	18	6	0	12	472	574	-102	11	2	37	
7	Glasgow Hawks	18	6	0	12	411	451	-40	7	4	35	
8	Heriot's	18	5	0	13	403	595	-192	8	4	30	
9	Musselburgh	18	5	0	13	322	581	-259	7	3	30	
10	GHA	18	4	0	14	427	566	-139	7	4	27	Relegated

=== Playoffs ===
Semi-finals
4 March – Mansfield Park
Hawick	18
Marr	6
4 March – Malleny Park
Currie	35
Edinburgh Academicals	7

Final
11 March – Mansfield Park
Hawick	21
Currie	18

=== Semifinals ===
4 March 2022
15:00

Hawick	18–6	Marr
Try: McKean 35' c Linton 60' c Con: Ford (1/3); Pen: Ford 45' c, 75' c		Pen: Sturgeon 25' c, 50' c

Mansfield Park
Referee: Sam O'Neil

4 March 2022
15:00

Currie	35–7	Edinburgh Academicals
Try: McGovern 5' c, 49'; Davies 35' c Nelson 50' c Sim 70' c Con: Forbes (5/6)		Try: Lacour 45'; Con: Loomes (1/1)

Malleny Park
Referee: Ross Mabon

=== Final ===
11 March 2022
15:00

Hawick	21–18	Currie
Try: Renwick 40+2'; McKean 80+5'; Con: Ford (1/2); Pen: Ford 5', 42', 55'	Report	Try: Sim 25'; McGovern 78'; Con: Forbes (1/2); Pen: Forbes 3', 14'

Mansfield Park
Referee: Michael Todd

Team details

Hawick
Currie

FB	K Ford
W	C Welsh
C	A Mitchell
C	E Reilly
W	R McKean
FH	K Brunton
SH	H Patterson
F	S Muir
F	F Renwick
F	N Little
L	C Sutherland
L	D Redpath
P	S Graham
H	C Renwick
P	J Linton
Head Coach:
Matty Douglas

FB	C Brett
W	K McGovern
C	DJ Innes
C	G Cannie
W	I Sim
FH	J Forbes
SH	G Christie
F	C Anderson
F	R Stewart
F	C Ramsay
L	W Inglis
L	E Stewart
P	A McCallum
H	G Nelson
P	R Davies
Head Coach:
Mark Cairns

== National Division One ==
2022–23 Tennent's National League Division One Table
	Club	Played	Won	Drawn	Lost	Points For	Points Against	Points Difference	Try Bonus	Losing Bonus	Points	Notes
1	Kelso	22	20	0	2	647	309	338	14	2	96	Promoted
2	Ayr	22	18	0	4	727	420	307	15	1	88	
3	Melrose	22	17	0	5	779	497	282	17	3	86	
4	Gala	22	14	0	8	635	565	70	13	3	72	
5	Highland	22	13	0	9	561	398	163	10	5	67	
6	Biggar	22	14	0	8	491	424	67	5	2	63	
7	Dundee	22	8	0	14	561	578	-17	10	5	45	
8	GHK	22	8	0	14	546	696	-150	10	3	45	
9	Watsonians	22	7	0	15	519	558	-39	7	4	39	
10	Stirling	22	8	0	14	444	671	-227	5	2	39	Relegated
11	Aberdeen Grammar	22	3	0	19	358	810	-452	3	4	19	Relegated
12	Stewart's Melville	22	2	0	20	376	718	-342	5	5	18	Relegated

== National Division Two ==
2022–23 Tennent's National League Division Two Table
	Club	Played	Won	Drawn	Lost	Points For	Points Against	Points Difference	Try Bonus	Losing Bonus	Points	Notes
1	Glasgow Academicals	22	18	0	4	714	318	396	14	1	87	Promoted
2	Newton Stewart	22	18	0	4	691	296	395	15	1	87	
3	Falkirk	22	18	0	4	717	433	284	13	0	85	
4	Peebles	22	14	0	8	484	383	101	8	3	67	
5	Kirkcaldy	22	13	0	9	623	638	-15	13	2	65	
6	Lasswade	22	12	0	10	409	409	0	4	6	58	
7	Berwick	22	10	0	12	537	520	17	10	5	55	
8	Preston Lodge	22	8	1	13	479	533	-54	10	4	48	Relegated
9	Dumfries Saints	22	9	1	12	444	448	-4	5	6	46	Relegated
10	Boroughmuir	22	6	0	16	469	743	-224	7	3	34	Relegated
11	Cartha Queens Park	22	3	0	19	407	889	-482	5	4	21	Relegated
12	Hamilton	22	1	2	19	406	770	-364	6	4	18	Relegated

== National Division Three ==
2022–23 Tennent's National League Division Three Table
	Club	Played	Won	Drawn	Lost	Points For	Points Against	Points Difference	Try Bonus	Losing Bonus	Points	Notes
1	Gordonians	20	18	0	2	968	321	647	17	1	90	Promoted
2	Hillhead/Jordanhill	20	16	0	4	678	261	317	13	3	80	
3	Howe of Fife	20	14	0	6	877	382	495	15	4	75	
4	West of Scotland	20	14	0	6	576	497	79	13	3	70	
5	Allan Glen's	20	11	0	9	623	378	245	13	6	63	
6	Orkney	20	12	0	8	565	622	-57	13	2	61	
7	Strathmore	20	11	0	9	575	554	21	9	2	55	Relegated
8	Whitecraigs	20	7	0	13	498	575	-77	9	5	42	Relegated
9	Murrayfield Wanderers	20	3	0	17	463	867	-404	11	3	23	Relegated
10	Perthshire	20	3	0	17	392	870	-478	6	2	18	Relegated
11	Greenock Wanderers	20	1	0	19	232	1020	-788	1	0	5	Relegated
12	Royal High	0	0	0	0	0	0	0	0	0	0	Relegated

1. Royal High were excluded from the tournament and all their matches were cancelled.
