= 2011–12 Scottish League Championship =

The 2011-12 Scottish League Championship (or 2012-13 RBS Scottish League Championship for sponsorship reasons) was the 38th season of formal domestic rugby union leagues in Scotland. The season was contested between August 2011 and April 2012, with Melrose RFC winning their eighth Championship and Gala RFC winning the Cup.

== Scottish Premiership, 2011-2012 ==
=== Division One ===
- Aberdeen Grammar
- Ayr RFC
- Boroughmuir RFC
- Currie RFC
- Dundee HSFP
- Edinburgh Academicals RFC
- Gala RFC
- Glasgow Hawks
- Hawick RFC
- Heriots RFC
- Melrose RFC
- Stirling County RFC

Details:

=== Division Two ===
- Biggar RFC
- Falkirk RFC
- Hamilton RFC
- Hillhead/Jordanhill RFC
- Jed-Forest RFC
- Kelso RFC
- Peebles RFC
- Selkirk RFC
- Stewart's Melville FP
- Watsonians RFC
- West of Scotland RFC
- Whitecraigs RFC

Details:

=== Division Three ===
- Ardrossan Academicals RFC
- Cartha Queens Park RFC
- Dalziel RFC
- Dumfries RFC
- Greenock Wanderers RFC
- Glasgow Hutchesons Aloysians RFC
- Haddington RFC
- Howe of Fife RFC
- Kirkcaldy RFC
- Lasswade RFC
- Morgan Academy RFC
- Perthshire RFC

Details:

== Scottish National Leagues, 2011-2012 ==
=== Division One ===
- Dunfermline RFC
- Edinburgh University RFC
- Ellon RFC
- Garnock RFC
- Hawick YM RFC
- Kilmarnock RFC
- Langholm RFC
- Linlithgow RFC
- Livingston RFC
- Murrayfield Wanderers RFC
- Musselburgh RFC
- Royal High Corstorphine RFC

Details:
