= 2013–14 Scottish League Championship =

The 2013–14 Scottish League Championship, or 2013–14 RBS Scottish League Championship for sponsorship reasons, was the 40th season of formal domestic rugby union leagues in Scotland.

The season was contested between August 2013 and March 2014 with Melrose RFC overhauling Gala RFC to win the Championship on a dramatic final day of the season.

== Premier Division ==
2013–14 RBS Premier Division Table
	Club	Played	Won	Drawn	Lost	Points For	Points Against	Points Difference	Try Bonus	Losing Bonus	Points	Notes
1	Melrose	18	15	0	3	494	312	182	9	0	69	Champions
2	Gala	18	13	1	4	481	315	186	10	4	68	2014-15 B&I Cup
3	Ayr	18	13	0	5	456	294	162	11	2	65	2014-15 B&I Cup
4	Heriot's	18	12	1	5	403	347	56	5	3	58	2014-15 B&I Cup
5	Glasgow Hawks	18	6	2	10	392	416	-24	4	5	37	
6	Hawick RFC	18	6	1	11	354	449	-95	3	5	34	
7	Currie	18	7	1	10	357	464	-107	3	1	34	
8	Stirling County	18	6	0	12	278	358	-80	2	7	33	
9	Edinburgh Academicals	18	6	0	12	339	485	-146	5	2	31	Relegation play-off
10	Aberdeen Grammar	18	3	0	15	338	452	-114	3	8	23	Relegated

== National League ==
2013–14 RBS National League Table
	Club	Played	Won	Drawn	Lost	Points For	Points Against	Points Difference	Try Bonus	Losing Bonus	Points	Notes
1	Boroughmuir	18	16	0	2	591	246	345	13	1	78	Promoted
2	Stewart's Melville FP	18	13	1	4	381	293	88	7	2	63	Promotion play-off
3	Watsonians RFC	18	12	0	6	592	319	273	9	5	62	
4	Dundee High School FP	18	12	1	5	499	303	196	7	2	59	
5	Selkirk RFC	18	10	1	7	503	349	154	8	4	54	
6	Kelso RFC	18	10	1	7	411	454	-43	7	2	51	
7	Peebles RFC	18	6	1	11	339	399	-60	4	2	32	
8	GHA RFC	18	4	0	14	298	581	-283	4	2	22	
9	Hillhead/Jordanhill RFC	18	3	0	15	272	558	-286	3	4	19	
10	Biggar RFC	18	1	1	16	230	614	-384	0	3	9	

=== Premier Division / National League play-off ===
5 April 2014
15:00

Edinburgh Academicals	23 - 13	Stewart's Melville FP

Lasswade RFC

=== Championship ===
==== Championship A ====
2013–14 RBS Championship A Table
	Club	Played	Won	Drawn	Lost	Points For	Points Against	Points Difference	Try Bonus	Losing Bonus	Points	Notes
1	Marr RFC	18	15	0	3	620	249	379	11	1	72	Promoted
2	Cartha Queens Park RFC	18	14	0	4	565	269	296	12	3	71	2014-15 National 2
3	Hamilton RFC	18	14	0	4	632	292	340	11	2	69	2014-15 National 2
4	Falkirk RFC	18	13	0	5	505	314	191	11	2	65	2014-15 National 2
5	Whitecraigs RFC	18	11	0	7	436	344	92	7	3	54	2014-15 National 2
6	Ardrossan Academicals RFC	18	9	0	9	410	500	-90	9	1	46	2014-15 National 2
7	Greenock Wanderers RFC	18	7	0	11	372	419	-47	6	3	37	2014-15 National 2
8	West of Scotland RFC	18	4	0	14	274	678	-404	3	2	21	
9	Dumfries RFC	18	3	0	15	229	584	-355	3	2	17	
10	Dalziel RFC	18	0	0	18	156	558	-402	0	3	3	

==== Championship B ====
2013–14 RBS Championship B Table
	Club	Played	Won	Drawn	Lost	Points For	Points Against	Points Difference	Try Bonus	Losing Bonus	Points	Notes
1	Jed-Forest RFC	18	17	0	1	666	218	448	12	1	81	Promoted
2	Howe of Fife RFC	18	16	0	2	909	229	680	15	1	80	2014-15 National 2
3	Musselburgh RFC	18	15	0	3	642	367	275	12	2	74	2014-15 National 2
4	Livingston RFC	18	9	0	9	398	470	-72	6	3	45	2014-15 National 2
5	Haddington RFC	18	7	1	10	416	427	-11	6	5	41	2014-15 National 2
6	Kirkcaldy RFC	18	7	1	10	424	482	-58	7	2	39	2014-15 National 2
7	Aberdeenshire RFC	18	7	0	11	367	539	-172	7	4	39	2014-15 National 2
8	Lasswade RFC	18	5	0	13	347	592	-245	5	3	23	
9	Murrayfield Wanderers RFC	18	4	0	14	290	560	-270	2	3	19	
10	Hawick YM RFC	18	2	0	16	219	794	-575	1	2	8	
