= Dalkeith RFC =

Scottish rugby union club, based in Dalkeith, Midlothian

(Scotland) Dalkeith RFC
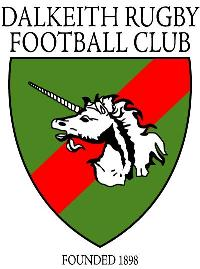
- Full name: Dalkeith Rugby Football Club
- Founded: 1898; 128 years ago
- Ground(s): Kings Park, Dalkeith
- President: Jamie Simpson
- Captain: Scott Rae
- League: East Division Two
- 2025–26: East Division One, 8th of 8

Dalkeith RFC is a Scottish rugby union club based in Dalkeith, Midlothian. They are founding and continuing full members of the Scottish Rugby Union and play home games at Kings Park, Dalkeith. The club currently plays in East Division Two.

== History ==
The club was formed in 1898, playing its first match against Edinburgh Institution 2nd XV (now Stewart's Melville) on 14 October. Dalkeith won 60–0 with six tries. Although the team line-up that played that day was not recorded, a team photograph from 1899 hangs in the clubhouse.

The club's first president was J.C. Paterson and the captain was J. Warden, a farmer at Wester Cowden. During the first year, the club also played against Morningside, Brunstone, Heriots 2nd XV and Watsonians 3rd XV. Clubs played in 1899 included Heriots, Royal High School, Edinburgh University, Peebles and Corstorphine, with J. Duncan captaining the side that season. The first annual supper was held in the Cross Keys Hotel on 9 March 1900, where a pipe was presented to the club referee, George Goldie of Eskdale Lodge.

The club ceased playing in 1915, due to the First World War; the captain that year was R.Stewart and the president was Sir Henry Dundas. The club reformed in February 1934 following a meeting of interested players at the Scientific Hall, where George Dick was elected president. Club colours of red, white and green were adopted and the first match against local rivals Lasswade was played on 29 September 1934 at Kirkbank. Three seasons later Musselburgh RFC called a meeting to discuss with the other clubs in Midlothian the possibility of amalgamating under the Musselburgh name. As most of those present were did not support the proposal, it did not proceed, but at a meeting in October the members of Dalkeith and Lasswade decided to merge, taking the Lasswade name due to their greater membership.

The club was suspended again due to the Second World War, and Dalkeith RFC reformed as a separate entity in March 1946, with George Dick as president and Captain Jim Penman. The first match was played on 19 September 1946 against Rosyth. The club was gifted a set of navy blue jerseys by S.B. Syme from Newtongrange. At a meeting in the band hall in Newtongrange the former colours of red, white and green were reaffirmed as the club colours. From 1946 to 1956 matches were played at Kirkbank, with a byre used as a changing room and a cold water tap and two tubs as washing facilities. During this time, accountant Pat Shaw became president. The lease of an old guardhouse at the King's Line Barracks, Newbattle, was negotiated, which was then converted into clubrooms.

Notable players during this year included Adam Robson (1949) who went on to play for Hawick and gain 22 caps for Scotland before becoming president of the Scottish Rugby Union, and Brian Henderson, who played for Edinburgh Wanderers and gained 12 Scottish Caps. The club's Diamond jubilee was celebrated on 27 March 1958 in the Unicorn Inn. In the spring of 1959 the club moved to King's Park, with the tennis pavilion being used as the changing rooms. A celebration match was played in April 1959.

1963 saw the inception of the Dalkeith Shield, a 15-a-side knockout tournament for clubs in the Lothians. The tournament is still running, and is the longest-running 15-a-side tournament in Scotland. Clubs who competed in the early years of competition include Haddington, Currie and Preston Lodge. In the late 1960s the club developed plans to improve the dilapidated clubhouse and changing facilities. Bill Dunnett, president from 1966 to 1969, oversaw the development of the new clubhouse, opened on 6 September 1972. A match to mark the opening was held between Dalkeith and a Scottish International Side including Sandy Carmichael, Ian McLauchlan, Jim Telfer, Jim Renwick, Andy Irvine, Dougie Morgan, Arthur Brown, Colin Telfer, Nairn McEwan and former Dalkeith player Jock Bertinussin.

Notable Dalkeith players of the era included Bill Ingram, who later played for Melrose and the South District team, and Tom Jack who played for Gala. Businessman David Murray played for the club until he lost both legs in a car accident while driving home from a match. When the National Leagues were introduced in the 1970s, Dalkeith entered the 7th Division in season 1976–77. The club was runner-up in that year, winning promotion to Division 6 alongside Stirling County. The following year the club became champions, having beaten Stirling in front of one of the largest crowds ever seen in King's Park. The peak of the club's league progress was Division 5, and since then the lower reaches of Division 6 & 7. Dalkeith won their own Shield tournament in 1976, and again in 2001 and 2004.

In the 2023/24 season, Dalkeith Rugby Club were awarded Community Club of the Year by Scottish Rugby. Also in 2023/24, Stevie Halliday was awarded Volunteer of the Season for Youth Rugby at both Regional and National level, and in 2022/23, Susan McGhee was awarded the same recognition at Regional level. Also in 2024, Dalkeith celebrated their 125th year with a whole club tour to Lloret de Mar, bringing together their senior men, senior ladies, former players and members with a 60+ person tour. A huge success for the club.

Dalkeith Rugby Club supports rugby from age 2, with Little Ruggers, Minis (boys and girls, P1-P7), Youth boys and girls, Senior Men and Ladies, as well as supporting Midlothian Walking Rugby, who celebrated their 10th anniversary in 2026.
