= Scottish Premiership Division One =

Scottish rugby union league

- Sport: Rugby union
- Founded: 1973
- No. of teams: 10
- Country: Scotland
- Most recent champion: Melrose RFC
- Relegation to: Scottish National League

The Scottish Premiership is the highest level club division in Scotland's national rugby union league divisions, and therefore part of the Scottish League Championship.

It contains many of the country's highest profile clubs. However it is not the highest level of rugby union in Scotland, as Edinburgh Rugby and Glasgow Warriors play against Irish, Welsh and Italian teams in the Pro14.

Some matches are shown live on BBC Alba.

Until the 2009–10 season, the bottom two teams were relegated to the Second Division. Over the subsequent two seasons, and as part of a two-phased reconstruction announced by the Scottish Rugby Council, the league moved from a 12-team league linear structure into a 10-team league pyramid structure. From the start of the 2012–13 season promotion/relegation between the Premiership and the newly formed National League (formerly the Second Division) is determined as follows: the winner of the National League is automatically promoted replacing the bottom placed team from the Premiership with a play-off between the 9th placed Premiership team and the 2nd placed National League team to determine the second promotion place.

The underlying principles behind league reconstruction as set out by the Season Structure Working Party of the Scottish Rugby Council were (a) to shorten the season, (b) to reduce travel costs, (c) to reduce time involved for all, (d) to assist in growing the game and (e) to retain players in the game.

The current teams playing in the Premier League are:

== Premier League, 2015–16 ==
- Ayr RFC
- Boroughmuir RFC
- Currie RFC
- Dundee HSFP
- Gala RFC
- Hawick RFC
- Heriots RFC
- Melrose RFC
- Selkirk RFC
- Stirling County RFC

== Past winners ==
1973. Hawick
1974. Hawick
1975. Hawick
1976. Hawick
1977. Hawick
1978. Hawick
1979. Heriot's FP
1980. Gala
1981. Gala
1982. Hawick
1983. Gala
1984. Hawick
1985. Hawick
1986. Hawick
1987. Hawick
1988. Kelso
1989. Kelso
1990. Melrose
1991. Boroughmuir
1992. Melrose
1993. Melrose
1994. Melrose
1995. Stirling County
1996. Melrose
1997. Melrose
1998. Watsonians
1999. Heriot's FP
2000. Heriot's FP
2001. Hawick
2002. Hawick
2003. Boroughmuir
2004. Glasgow Hawks
2005. Glasgow Hawks
2006. Glasgow Hawks
2007. Currie RFC
2008. Boroughmuir
2009. Ayr RFC
2010. Currie RFC
2011. Melrose RFC
2012. Melrose RFC
2013. Ayr RFC
2014. Melrose RFC
2015. Heriot's FP

== See also ==
- Rugby union in Scotland
