= Gerry McGuinness =

Scotland international rugby union player

- Born: Gerald Michael McGuinness; 14 September 1953 (age 73) Glasgow, Scotland

Rugby union career
- Position: prop
Amateur team(s)
Years	Team	Apps	(Points)
1977–1987	West of Scotland		
1987–	Hawick		
Provincial / State sides
Years	Team	Apps	(Points)
- Glasgow District
1987	South of Scotland		
International career
Years	Team	Apps	(Points)
1982–1985	Scotland	7	
Coaching career
- Years: Team
- 2007–2010: Hawick
- 2010–2012: Peebles

Gerald Michael McGuinness (born 14 September 1953) is a Scottish rugby coach and former player who won seven caps for Scotland playing as a prop forward.

== Rugby Union career ==
=== Amateur career ===
In 1977 he played for West of Scotland. In 1987 he moved to Hawick RFC.

=== Provincial career ===
He was capped by Glasgow District while still with West of Scotland.

In 1987 played for the South of Scotland.

=== International career ===
McGuinness's first international match was against Australia at Brisbane on 4 July 1982, Scotland's first victory in a full international match in the Southern hemisphere. The last of his seven caps was against England at Twickenham on 16 March 1985.

He played one match for Barbarians FC in 1988.

=== Coaching career ===
He started youth development work in 2007 at Hawick RFC. He became Hawick head coach in 2009 and despite the club being promoted to the Scottish Premiership Division One, he was sacked the following year.

He then joined Scottish Premiership Division Two side Peebles as assistant coach, although left the club in 2012.
