= Scottish Championship Leagues =

- Sport: Rugby union
- Founded: 2012
- Folded: 2014
- Replaced by: National League Division Two and National League Division Three
- No. of teams: 20 (2 leagues)
- Country: Scotland
- Last champions: Marr RFC and Jed-Forest RFC

The Scottish Championship Leagues (known as the RBS Championship Leagues for sponsorship reasons) formed the third tier in the Scottish rugby union system for amateur rugby union clubs in Scotland between 2012 and 2014.

== History ==
The Championship Leagues were created for the 2012/13 season as part of a reconstruction which reduced the number of fully nationwide leagues from six to just two. A pyramid structure was implemented which saw the Championship Leagues sit between the National and Regional Leagues. The 20 teams were divided into Championship Leagues A and B along approximate east/west geographical lines.

At the 2013 Scottish Rugby Union AGM, a motion was successfully put forward by Haddington RFC and seconded by Selkirk RFC which called for the leagues to be restructured into three nationalised 12 team leagues below the Premiership. This meant the Championship Leagues would be replaced by National Leagues Divisions Two and Three.

== Promotion and Relegation ==
The winners of both Championship A and B gained promotion at the end of the season to the National League. The bottom placed team in both Championship A and B were relegated to the appropriate Regional League. A third team was relegated in 2012/13 via a play-off between the 9th-placed team in each League.

In 2013/14 the play-off was scrapped along with relegation to the Regional Leagues. Teams finishing 2nd to 7th moved into National League Division Two, while the remaining three teams in each Championship League were joined by six the Regional Leagues to form National League Division Three.

== Winners ==
Season	Championship League A	Championship League B
2012-13	GHA RFC	Peebles RFC
2013-14	Marr RFC	Jed-Forest RFC

== See also ==
- Scottish National League Division Two
- Scottish National League Division Three
