= Scottish National League Division Two =

National rugby union league division in Scotland

- Formerly: Championship Leagues, Premiership Division Three, National League Division Three
- Sport: Rugby union
- Founded: 1973
- No. of teams: 10
- Country: Scotland
- Most recent champion: GHK (2nd title)
- Most titles: Kirkcaldy & Haddington (4 titles)
- Level on pyramid: 3
- Promotion to: National League Division One
- Relegation to: National League Division Three
- Domestic cup: National League Cup

The Scottish National League Division Two (known as Arnold Clark National League Division 2 for sponsorship reasons) is the third tier of the Scottish League Championship for amateur rugby union clubs in Scotland.

The division was established in its current format in 2014 after the creation of three national leagues below the Premiership. This replaced the two regional Championship Leagues which were scrapped after just two seasons.

For the 2023–24 season, the division was reduced from 12 to 10 teams.

== Promotion and Relegation ==
The top team is promoted to National League Division 1 while the bottom teams is relegated to National League Division 3.

== 2026–27 Teams ==
Location of teams in 2026-27 Scottish National League Division Two

Departing were GHK, promoted to National League Division 1 while Berwick were relegated to National League Division 3.

Joining were Gordonians relegated from National League Division 1 and Preston Lodge promoted from National League Division 3.

Team	Ground	Location	2025–26
Dundee	Mayfield	Dundee	7th
Falkirk	Horne Park	Falkirk	5th
Gordonians	Countesswells	Aberdeen	Relegated (10th)
Highland	Canal Park	Inverness	3rd
Howe of Fife	Duffus Park	Cupar	6th
Kirkcaldy	Beveridge Park	Kirkcaldy	8th
Newton Stewart	Bladnoch Park	Wigtown	2nd
Peebles	The Gytes	Peebles	9th
Preston Lodge	Pennypit Park	Prestonpans	Promoted (1st)
Stewart's Melville	Inverleith	Edinburgh	4th

== Past winners ==
Winners of the third tier competition – includes National League Division Three (1973–1995), Premiership Division Three (1996–2012) and National League Division Two (2015–present)

National League Division Three

1974. Kilmarnock
1975. Highland
1976. Haddington
1977. Preston Lodge
1978. Leith Academicals
1979. Royal High School FP
1980. Glasgow Academicals
1981. Haddington
1982. Ayr
1983. Aberdeen GSFP
1984. Edinburgh Wanderers
1985. Musselburgh
1986. Corstorphine
1987. Currie
1988. Langholm
1989. Kirkcaldy
1990. Dundee HSFP
1991. Peebles
1992. Grangemouth Stags
1993. Haddington
1994. Gordonians
1995. Ayr

Premiership Division Three

1996. Glasgow Academicals
1997. Kirkcaldy
1998. Selkirk
1999. Peebles
2000. Edinburgh Academical
2001. Murrayfield Wanderers
2002. Hutchesons/Aloysians
2003. Dundee HSFP
2004. Edinburgh Academicals
2005. Cartha Queens Park
2006. Hamilton
2007. Haddington
2008. Gala
2009. Kirkcaldy
2010. Hillhead/Jordanhill
2011. Whitecraigs
2012. Howe of Fife (no promotion)
2013. Championship Leagues A and B
2014. Championship Leagues A and B

National League Division 2

2015. Musselburgh
2016. Hamilton
2017. Cartha Queens Park
2018. Kirkcaldy
2019. Biggar
2020. Null and void
2021. No competition
2022. GHK
2023. Glasgow Academicals
2024. Peebles
2025. Gordonians
2026. GHK
