= Scott Nichol =

Scott Nichol may refer to:

- Scott Nichol (ice hockey) (born 1974), Canadian ice hockey player
- Scott Nichol (rugby union) (born 1970), Scottish rugby union player

== See also ==
- Scott Nichols, American inventor and marketer
- Scott Nicholls (born 1978), English motorcycle speedway rider
