= Jim Ford (rugby union) =

- Born: James Ford; 24 June 1869 Gordon, Scottish Borders, Scotland
- Died: 13 October 1935 (aged 66) Edinburgh, Scotland

Rugby union career
- Position: Forward
Amateur team(s)
Years	Team	Apps	(Points)
- Gala
Provincial / State sides
Years	Team	Apps	(Points)
1892	East of Scotland District		
1892	South of Scotland District		
International career
Years	Team	Apps	(Points)
1893	Scotland	1	(0)

Jim Ford (24 June 1869 – 13 October 1935) was a Scotland international rugby union player.

== Rugby Union career ==
=== Amateur career ===
Ford played rugby union for Gala.

=== Provincial career ===
He played for East of Scotland District against West of Scotland District on 23 January 1892.

He played for South of Scotland District in their match against Northumberland on 12 November 1892.

=== International career ===
Ford was capped once by Scotland, in 1893. He took the place of Adam Dalgleish who was unable to attend as a reserve.

== Family ==
His parents were James Ford (1834-1908) and Isabella Messer (1834-1916). Jim was one of their 4 sons.

He married Jane Walker (1870-1942) in Galashiels in 1893.

== Death ==
He died in Edinburgh Royal Infirmary on 13 October 1935.
