= Jim Greenwood (rugby union) =

British Lions & Scotland international rugby union player

- Born: James Thomson Greenwood; 2 December 1928 Dunfermline, Scotland
- Died: 12 September 2010 (aged 81) Dumfries, Scotland

Rugby union career
- Position: Number 8/Flanker
Amateur team(s)
Years	Team	Apps	(Points)
- Dunfermline RFC
–	Perthshire Academicals		
–	RAFRU		
Provincial / State sides
Years	Team	Apps	(Points)
- North (comb.)
-	North and Midlands		
International career
Years	Team	Apps	(Points)
1952–1959	Scotland	20	(0)
1955	British Lions	4	(0)

James Thomson Greenwood (2 December 1928 – 13 September 2010) was a Scottish rugby union player and coach. He won twenty caps for Scotland and four for the British Lions as a number eight and flanker.

As a coach and coach educator, he was an advocate of 'total rugby'. He is considered one of the most innovative and visionary thinkers in the game. In 2014 he was posthumously inducted into the IRB Hall of Fame.

== Playing career ==
Greenwood was born in Fife and educated at Dunfermline High School and Edinburgh University, where he read English.

He played club rugby for Dunfermline RFC and the North and Midlands team. He also played for Harlequins, the RAF and Eastern Counties during his national service in the RAF. After touring with the British Lions, he played for Perthshire Academicals.

His first international was in 1952 against France, but he was dropped shortly afterwards. He played well in the District matches and trials of 1954, leading to his re-selection for the national team. He became Scottish captain, but after losing 15–0 to France, lost that position to Angus Cameron, while keeping his place on the team. In the next season, he became captain once more, and led the side for three more years.

He played mostly at No 8, but also at flanker, a position at which he was capped four times by the British Lions against South Africa during the Lions’ 1955 tour. Greenwood played 16 matches on the tour, and scored tries in the first and fourth tests of the series, which the Lions drew 2-2 with South Africa. In a newspaper report at the time, he was described as "without equal among his contemporaries for a combination of skill, perception and deadly physical pace."

He played 18 games for the Barbarians between 1955 and 1958, the last being on 28 May 1958 at the RFUEA Ground, Nairobi, versus East Africa; a ground that he had previously visited whilst on tour with the Lions, though on that occasion he had not been selected to play. He also played for the combined Ireland/Scotland team against England/Wales in the 1959 Twickenham Jubilee match.

Greenwood was in contention for a place on the next Lions tour (in 1959), but suffered an injury (variously described as a broken collarbone or dislocated shoulder) playing against Ireland that season. Although he bravely played on, switching from number eight to flanker to accommodate his injury, he was forced to retire, aged 31.

Allan Massie wrote of him that:

"He was not a devastating tackler like Douglas Elliot or Ron Glasgow, though he was a very safe one. His first quality was his mobility; he was an example to young back-row players in the way he kept close to the ball and in his anticipation of the run of play. It brought him one notable Test try in South Africa when he gathered a cross-kick to surge over the line. He was one of the last forwards to be a notably good dribbler of the ball."

== Coaching career ==
Greenwood was a teacher by profession, and taught at Glenalmond College, Cheltenham College and at Tiffin School in Kingston upon Thames.

He moved to Loughborough Colleges (now Loughborough University) in 1968, teaching English, Comparative Studies and coaching rugby. At Loughborough he influenced generations of rugby players, coaches and students including Clive Woodward, Andy Robinson, Fran Cotton, and Liza Burgess. Greenwood was an advocate of fifteen man 'total rugby', the whole team playing as a unit, and capable of both back and forward play. He was considered one of rugby's leading thinkers, and has often been described as a coaching guru.

In the 1970s Greenwood ran rugby coaching courses at Loughborough's Summer Schools, attended by coaches from across the UK and from countries such as Spain and Portugal. He later toured the world coaching and advising, helping to establish coaching structures in Argentina, Japan, the US and Canada. He spent two years at the University of Tsukuba in Japan, and earned the nickname 'Mr Rugby' in New Zealand. He also coached the England women's team, although he never coached a Scotland team.

He published three books – Improve Your Rugby (1967), Total Rugby (1978) and Think Rugby (1986). Total Rugby and Think Rugby are considered seminal books on rugby coaching, and have been updated and reprinted numerous times due to demand, as recently as 2015.

Greenwood described his views on the game:

"The rugby I’m concerned with as a coach is rugby at its most exciting – the 15-man handling game, in which every player is encouraged to show what we can do as an attacker, defender and supporting players, and in which the overall style of play gives him a chance to do so.

I was a teacher rather than a coach. I tried to get people thinking. I wanted each player to be his own coach, to encourage the player to expand their awareness, to find truth wherever it lay. All coaching is one-to-one: there's a place for the motivational speech, but it's far more effective to talk to people individually."

Clive Woodward wrote of Greenwood:

"Basically, I went to Loughborough for one reason, to play my best rugby, and for one man, Jim Greenwood. If I was going to play for England, it made sense to go where the best coach was… Jim’s book, Total Rugby, is the only rugby coaching book I’ve ever read. It was way ahead of its time, and has since become a closely studied classic, especially in New Zealand… No man has done more in our time to single-handedly transform the modern game of rugby than Jim Greenwood."

He retired to the village of Crossmichael near Castle Douglas in Kirkcudbrightshire although he remained in demand as a consultant. He died aged 81 in 2010.

== Honours ==
In 1998 Greenwood was one of the inaugural inductees into the National Coaching Foundation's Hall of Fame, and won the prestigious Geoffrey Dyson Award for his outstanding contribution.

In 2014 he was posthumously inducted into the IRB Hall of Fame.
