= Scott Nichol (rugby union) =

Scotland international rugby union player

- Born: Scott Alan Nichol; 18 June 1970 (age 56) Selkirk, Scotland
- Height: 5 ft 10 in (1.78 m)
- Weight: 73 kg (11 st 7 lb; 161 lb)

Rugby union career
- Position: Fly-half / Centre
Amateur team(s)
Years	Team	Apps	(Points)
-	Selkirk		
-2000	Melrose		
2000-10	Peebles		
Senior career
Years	Team	Apps	(Points)
1996-98	Border Reivers		
Provincial / State sides
Years	Team	Apps	(Points)
-1996	South of Scotland		
International career
Years	Team	Apps	(Points)
1991-92	Scotland 'B'	2	(0)
1993-97	Scotland 'A'	9	
1994	Scotland	1	(0)
National sevens team
Years	Team		Comps
-	Scotland 7s		7
Coaching career
- Years: Team
- Peebles (Player-Coach)
- 2010-14: Gala (Asst.)

Scott Nichol (born 18 June 1970) is a former Scotland international rugby union player. He played at Fly-half and Centre.

== Rugby Union career ==
=== Amateur career ===
He played for Selkirk.

He later moved to play for Melrose.

He moved to Peebles where he was player-coach.

=== Provincial and professional career ===
He played for South of Scotland District in the Scottish Inter-District Championship.

When Scotland's districts turned into professional sides in 1995, Nichol then played for the Border Reivers. Outwith the appearances in the Scottish Inter-District Championship for the Reivers, he played 9 times for them in the Heineken Cup.

=== International career ===
He was capped by Scotland 'B' to play Ireland 'B' on 22 December 1990 and played in the Scotland 'B' side against France 'B' in the spring of 1991.

He played for Scotland 'A'. He received 9 'A' caps in total.

He received a full senior cap for Scotland against Argentina in 1994.

He played for Scotland 7s in the Hong Kong Sevens.

=== Coaching career ===
He was a player-coach at Peebles.

He was an assistant coach for Gala from 2010-2014.
