= Peter Wright (rugby union, born 1967) =

British Lions & Scotland international rugby union player

- Born: Peter Wright; 30 December 1967 (age 58) Bonnyrigg, Midlothian
- Occupation(s): Blacksmith rugby coach HGV Driver

Rugby union career
- Position: Prop
Amateur team(s)
| Years | Team | Apps | (Points) |
- Lasswade
| – | Boroughmuir | | |
Senior career
| Years | Team | Apps | (Points) |
- Edinburgh
| – | Border Reivers | | |
International career
| Years | Team | Apps | (Points) |
| 1989 | Scotland 'B' | 1 | (0) |
| 1992–96 | Scotland | 21 | (5) |
| 1993 | British and Irish Lions | | |
Coaching career
- Years: Team
- Murrayfield Wanderers
- Glasgow Hawks
- 2019-: Glasgow High Kelvinside

Peter Wright (born 30 December 1967) is a former rugby union player and now coach.

== Rugby Union career ==
=== Amateur career ===
He played for Lasswade RFC and Boroughmuir.

=== Provincial and professional career ===
He played for Edinburgh District; and on professionalism in Scotland, played for Edinburgh Rugby and then Border Reivers.

=== International career ===
He was capped by Scotland B once, on 18 February 1989 against France 'B'.

He won 21 caps at prop for Scotland between 1992 and 1996, and toured New Zealand with the British and Irish Lions in 1993.

=== Coaching career ===
He now coaches Glasgow High Kelvinside. He previously coached the Glasgow Hawks.

In the 2004–05 season Wright coached Hawks to a BT League and Cup double, beating Dundee HSFP 29–17 in the cup final on the international pitch at Murrayfield. He is also a Scottish Rugby development officer in Dumfries and Galloway. Wright started his coaching at Murrayfield Wanderers, leading them to the SRU Bowl in 2000, before joining Hawks.

On BBC Radio Scotland, Wright said of Scottish players that, "If you tell them six times that they are no good they will believe you, but you have to tell them a million times that they are good to get the same result."
