= Lawrence Harvey (rugby union) =

Scotland international rugby union player

- Born: Lawrence Harvey; 31 January 1876 Glasgow, Scotland
- Died: 30 October 1953 (aged 77) Largs, Scotland

Rugby union career
- Position: Forward
Amateur team(s)
Years	Team	Apps	(Points)
- Greenock Wanderers
Provincial / State sides
Years	Team	Apps	(Points)
- Glasgow District
International career
Years	Team	Apps	(Points)
1899	Scotland	1	(0)

Lawrence Harvey (31 January 1876 – 30 October 1953) was a Scotland international rugby union player

== Rugby Union career ==
=== Amateur career ===
Harvey played for Greenock Wanderers.

=== Provincial career ===
He was capped by Glasgow District in 1898; scoring a try in the Inter-City match against Edinburgh District.

=== International career ===
He was capped once for the Scotland international side, turning out against Ireland in 1899.
