= Henry Polson =

Scotland rugby player

- Born: Adam Henry Polson; 19 November 1907 Galashiels, Scotland
- Died: 9 July 1992 (aged 84) Earlston, Scotland

Rugby union career
- Position: Flanker
Amateur team(s)
Years	Team	Apps	(Points)
- Gala
Provincial / State sides
Years	Team	Apps	(Points)
1931	South of Scotland District		
International career
Years	Team	Apps	(Points)
1930	Scotland	1	(0)

Henry Polson (19 November 1907 – 9 July 1992) was a Scotland international rugby union player.

== Rugby Union career ==
=== Amateur career ===
He played for Gala.

=== Provincial career ===
He was picked for the South of Scotland District against South Africa on 31 October 1931.

=== International career ===
He was capped once for Scotland in 1930.
