= James Reid Kerr =

British Lions & England international rugby union player & cricketer

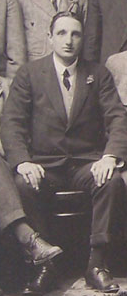
- Born: James Reid Kerr; 4 December 1883 Greenock, Renfrewshire, Scotland
- Died: 19 August 1963 (aged 79)
- School: Greenock Collegiate
- University: Glasgow University
- Occupation: Sugar Refining

Rugby union career
- Position: forward
Amateur team(s)
Years	Team	Apps	(Points)
- Greenock Wanderers RFC
Provincial / State sides
Years	Team	Apps	(Points)
1906	South Western District		
1909	Glasgow District		
International career
Years	Team	Apps	(Points)
1909	Scotland	1	(0)
1910	British & Irish Lions	0	(0)

James Reid Kerr (4 December 1883 – 19 August 1963) was a Scottish sportsman who played both rugby union and cricket for his country. He was also part of the first official British & Irish Lions team that toured South Africa in 1910.

== Early life ==
James Reid Kerr was born on 4 December 1883 in Greenock, Renfrewshire, Scotland. He was the son of Robert Kerr, a Sugar Refiner. After attending Greenock Collegiate and Glasgow University he worked for his father as a Sugar Chemist.

== Rugby Union career ==
=== Amateur career ===
Kerr played as a rugby forward for his local side, Greenock Wanderers RFC.

=== Provincial career ===
He captained the South Western District side against North of Scotland District in 1906.

He played for Glasgow District in the 1909 inter-city match against Edinburgh District.

=== International career ===
He played one game for Scotland, vs England at Richmond on 20 March 1909

The following year, he was selected for the first official British tour to South Africa (in that it was sanctioned and selected by the four Home Nations official governing bodies).

== Cricket career ==
Kerr also played cricket for Greenock as a right-handed batsman. In 279 matches he scored 5,262 runs at an average of 23.08, and he had a top score of 119. He went on to play for the Scotland team, making only one appearance in 1921. That was against Ireland. In that match he scored 15 runs over two innings. He was also the cousin of the famous Scottish cricketer, John Kerr.

== First World War ==
James Reid Kerr served as a captain the Argyll and Sutherland Highlanders during the First World War. During the war he saw action in the Gallipoli campaign in 1915.

== See also ==
- List of Scottish cricket and rugby union players
