= Kenny Murray =

Scottish rugby union coach (born 1973)

- Born: Kenny Murray; 4 September 1973 (age 53) Glasgow, Scotland
- School: Crookston Castle Secondary
- University: Napier University

Rugby union career
- Position: Fly-half
Amateur team(s)
Years	Team	Apps	(Points)
2001	Cartha Queens Park		
2001	Whitecraigs		
Coaching career
- Years: Team
- -2006: Cartha Queens Park
- 2006-08: Scottish Rugby Union (Reg. Development)
- 2008-13: Ayr RFC
- 2013-22: Glasgow Warriors (Asst.)
- 2022-: Scotland U20

Kenny Murray (born 4 September 1973 in Glasgow, Scotland) is a Scottish rugby union coach. He is currently the Head coach of the Scotland U20 team. He was previously an Asst. Coach at Glasgow Warriors. As a player he played at Fly-half.

== Rugby Union career ==
=== Playing career ===
==== Amateur career ====
Murray played for Cartha Queens Park.

He moved to Whitecraigs in 2001.

=== Coaching career ===
==== Cartha Queens Park ====
After playing, at the age of 30, he became the Head Coach of Cartha Queens Park until 2006.

An ambitious coach he was keen on a Glasgow Warriors incentive which saw Donnie Macfadyen, John Barclay and Tim Barker train his Cartha players on clearing out skills and dealing with the ball on ground.

"I think it's an excellent initiative. To have input at our session from guys who are playing at the professional level will be great for our players, especially given that we can get specific help on the areas we'd like to concentrate on most. Seeing the different levels of the game working together is really encouraging for rugby in Glasgow."

He guided Cartha through a series of promotions through the Scottish national leagues.

He won Scotland's Coach of the Season in 2006.

==== Scottish Rugby Union ====
He left Cartha in 2006 to become a Regional Development Officer at the SRU. This job precluded coaching any rugby teams to maintain neutrality and Murray became frustrated at the lack of a coaching role. He quit in 2008.

==== Ayr ====
In 2008, he moved to Ayr Rugby Club as head coach. Under his leadership, in his first season 2008–09, Ayr won the Premier Division for the first time in its history. They won the Scottish Cup in 2009–10 and again in 2010–11.

In the 2010–11 season, Murray guided Ayr to the Quarter finals of the British and Irish Cup, so far the only Scottish side to get this far.

In 2012–13, Ayr scooped a League and Cup double by winning the Premier Division and the Scottish Cup. They also won the Bill McLaren Shield and the RBS West Cup in that season. He was deemed the most successful coach in the Scottish club game.

==== Glasgow Warriors ====
He joined Glasgow Warriors in July 2013 as an Assistant Coach.

In 2014, Murray was awarded the John MacPhail coaching scholarship to study New Zealand rugby coaching.

In 2015, it was announced that Murray would study for the new UKCC Level 4 coach qualification at Edinburgh's Napier University.

He was a key note speaker at the National Coaches Conference in 2015, lecturing to 130 youth and adult coaches from across Scotland.

On 19 June 2017, Murray was one of the first Scottish coaches to graduate from the Napier University course.

==== Scotland U20s ====
Murray moved from Glasgow Warriors to take the Head Coach role of the Scotland U20 team. As part of this role he was also given the title of Head of Player Transition.
