= Graham Ellis =

- Born: David Graham Ellis; 6 April 1965 (age 61) Hawick, Scotland
- Height: 6 ft 0 in (1.83 m)
- Weight: 16 st 3 lb (103 kg)
- School: Hawkwick High
- Occupation: teacher

Rugby union career
- Position: Hooker
Amateur team(s)
Years	Team	Apps	(Points)
- Glasgow Academicals
- Jordanhill
- Currie
1989–	Stewart's Melville		
Provincial / State sides
Years	Team	Apps	(Points)
- Glasgow District
1987	Edinburgh District		
International career
Years	Team	Apps	(Points)
1997	Scotland	4	

Graham Ellis (born 6 April 1965) is a physical education teacher and retired Scottish rugby union player who received four caps as hooker.

== Early life ==
Ellis was born in Hawick, Scotland on 6 April 1965. He was educated at Hawick High School.

== Rugby Union career ==
=== Amateur career ===
He played 6 times for Hawick RFC in 1986/87 season. He played for Glasgow Academicals.

He also played club rugby for Jordanhill, Currie and Stewart's Melville.

=== Provincial career ===
In August 1989, having already played for Glasgow District, he was selected for Edinburgh District.

=== International career ===
In 1995 suffered a biceps muscle rupture ahead of Test match against Western Samoa. Ellis made his international debut against Wales at Murrayfield 18 January 1997. His last appearance against at France in Paris March 1997 having played all four games in the 1997 Five Nations Championship.

In April 1998 his contract was not renewed by the Scottish Rugby Union, despite having been one of Scotland's unused replacements for the Calcutta cup match a month before.

=== Coaching career ===
He went on to coach Stewart's Melville FP.

== Teaching career ==
Ellis worked as a PE teacher at Daniel Stewart's and Melville College. He later worked at Castle Manor Academy, a co-educational school in Suffolk.
