= Ryan Moffat =

Scottish rugby union player

- Born: Ryan Moffat

Rugby union career
- Position: Centre
Amateur team(s)
| Years | Team | Apps | (Points) |
- Whitecraigs
| – | Glasgow Hawks | | |
| – | Cartha Queens Park | | |
| – | Police Scotland | | |
Senior career
| Years | Team | Apps | (Points) |
| 2006-07 | Glasgow Warriors | 0 | (0) |

Ryan Moffat is a Scottish rugby union footballer. He plays at Centre.

== Rugby Union career ==
=== Amateur career ===
Moffat played for Whitecraigs, where he won big accolades in his debut season, and being described as 6ft1 and tonnes of fun. He then moved on to Glasgow Hawks. where he won back to back titles and a Scottish Cup. As a former Hawks player he was recently awarded the Silver Honour Cap for playing against the Army Rugby Union.

He then played for Cartha Queens Park. before moving back to Whitecraigs due to work commitments.

He plays rugby for Police Scotland and represents the British Police rugby team. He is the former captain of Police Scotland Glasgow.

=== Professional career ===
Moffat played for Glasgow District U18s, U19s and U20s. He also represented Scotland at U18s.

Moffat was part of the Glasgow Warriors back-up squad in the 2006-07 season.

He played in their first match against Newcastle Falcons on 18 August 2006.

Moffat then played in the 18 September 2006 match against Edinburgh Rugby.

He played both in the 2 October 2006 home match against the Border Reivers and the return away fixture on 27 November 2006.

Between those Reivers matches, he also played in the Warriors match against Scotland U20s on 13 November 2006.
