= John Fox (rugby union) =

Scotland international rugby union player

- Born: John Fox; 30 August 1921
- Died: 27 September 1999 (aged 78)

Rugby union career
- Position: Prop
Amateur team(s)
| Years | Team | Apps | (Points) |
- Gala RFC
Provincial / State sides
| Years | Team | Apps | (Points) |
- South of Scotland
International career
| Years | Team | Apps | (Points) |
| 1952 | Scotland | 4 | (0) |

John Fox (30 August 1921 – 27 September 1999) was a Scotland international rugby union footballer. Fox played as a Prop.

== Rugby union career ==
=== Amateur career ===
Fox played for Gala.

=== Provincial career ===
Fox played for South in the 1951 South v North match on 10 November. South won the match 18 points to nil.

=== International career ===
Fox was capped for Scotland four times in 1952, all of the caps coming in the Five Nations matches.
