= Jimmy Ferguson (rugby union) =

Scotland international rugby union player & referee

- Born: James Huck Ferguson; 19 October 1903 Edinburgh, Scotland
- Died: 23 April 1992 (aged 88) Edinburgh, Scotland

Rugby union career
- Position: Prop
Amateur team(s)
Years	Team	Apps	(Points)
- Gala
International career
Years	Team	Apps	(Points)
1928	Scotland	1	(0)
Refereeing career
Years	Competition		Apps
1936	Scottish Districts		

Jimmy Ferguson (19 October 1903 – 23 April 1992) was a Scotland international rugby union player whose regular playing position was Prop. After his playing career, he became a rugby union referee.

== Rugby Union career ==
=== Amateur career ===
Ferguson played as a forward for Gala.

=== International career ===
Ferguson was capped for Scotland for one match in 1928. This was the Home Nations' match against Wales.

=== Referee career ===
Ferguson refereed the Inter-City match between Glasgow District and Edinburgh District in 1936.
