= 1936–37 Scottish Districts season =

Rugby union competition

- Countries: Scotland
- Date: 1936–37
- Matches played: 1

The 1936–37 Scottish Districts season is a record of all the rugby union matches for Scotland's district teams.

== History ==
Glasgow District beat Edinburgh District in the Inter-City match.

== Results ==
Date	Try	Conversion	Penalty	Dropped goal	Goal from mark	Notes
1905–1947	3 points	2 points	3 points	4 points	3 points	

=== Inter-City ===
5 December 1936

Glasgow District	11 – 3	Edinburgh District
	Report

Old Anniesland
Referee: Jimmy Ferguson (Gala)

Glasgow District:
Edinburgh District:

=== Other Scottish matches ===
21 November 1936

North of Scotland District	v	South of Scotland District
	Report

Perth

North of Scotland District:
South of Scotland District:

=== Trial matches ===
19 December 1936

Scotland Probables	–	Scotland Possibles
	Report

Murrayfield Stadium

Scotland Probables:
Scottish Possibles:

16 January 1937

Scotland Probables	–	Scotland Possibles
	Preview

Murrayfield Stadium

Scotland Probables:
Scottish Possibles:

=== English matches ===
No other District matches played.

=== International matches ===
No touring matches this season.
