= Brian Henderson (rugby union) =

- Full name: Brian Carlyle Henderson
- Born: 31 January 1939 Edinburgh, Scotland
- Died: 5 November 2020 (aged 81) Edinburgh, Scotland
- School: Dalkeith High School

Rugby union career
- Position: Centre
International career
Years	Team	Apps	(Points)
1963–66	Scotland	12	(6)

Brian Carlyle Henderson (31 January 1939 – 5 November 2020) was a Scottish international rugby union player.

Born in Edinburgh, Henderson attended Dalkeith High School and had three seasons in the first XV, then began playing for Edinburgh Wanderers in the 1956–57 season, following a stint with local side Dalkeith RFC. He served in Aden during his national service with the Northamptonshire Regiment.

Henderson, a large centre three quarter, was a powerful runner and strong tackler. He stood at 6 ft 3 in and at close to 16 stone outsized many forwards. After debuting for Edinburgh District in 1960–61, Henderson gained his first Scotland cap in their final 1963 Five Nations fixture, against England at Twickenham. He won a further 11 caps over the next three years, forming a centre partnership with Iain Laughland. Both his two career tries came in a loss to France at Stade Colombes in 1965. He got recruited to tour Australasia with the British & Irish Lions in 1966, but was unavailable to make the trip.

After retiring from rugby at 27, Henderson spent the remainder of his working life with Norwich Union.

== See also ==
- List of Scotland national rugby union players
