= John Kerr (Scottish cricketer) =

Scottish cricketer

Personal information
- Born: 8 April 1885; Greenock, Scotland
- Died: 27 December 1972 (aged 87)
- Batting: Right-handed
- Bowling: Right-arm slow

Career statistics
Competition	First-class
Matches	32
Runs scored	1,975
Batting average	37.26
100s/50s	4/10
Top score	178*
Balls bowled	298
Wickets	7
Bowling average	36.00
5 wickets in innings	0
10 wickets in match	0
Best bowling	2/48
Catches/stumpings	31/–
- Source: CricketArchive, 16 April 2023

John Kerr (8 April 1885 – 27 December 1972) was a Scottish cricketer from Greenock.

A right-handed batsman, Kerr represented the Scotland national cricket team for 26 years and is their longest serving player of all time. His unbeaten 178 against Ireland in Dublin remained a national record for three decades until it was passed by James Aitchison. Aitchison was also the man to pass his record tally of 1975 runs for Scotland. Kerr played club cricket for Greenock and scored 21558 runs for them and made 49 hundreds.

He was also the cousin of the Scottish double international, James Reid-Kerr.
