= Adam Dalgleish =

Scotland international rugby union player

- Born: Adam Dalgleish; 1 September 1868 Bellingham, Northumberland, England
- Died: 14 September 1938 (aged 70) Galashiels, Scotland

Rugby union career
- Position: Forward
Amateur team(s)
Years	Team	Apps	(Points)
1886-96	Gala		
Provincial / State sides
Years	Team	Apps	(Points)
1887	East of Scotland District		
1893	Provinces District		
1895	South of Scotland District		
International career
Years	Team	Apps	(Points)
1890-94	Scotland	8	(0)

Adam Dalgleish (1 September 1868 – 14 September 1938) was a Scotland international rugby union player.

== Rugby Union career ==
=== Amateur career ===
Dalgleish played rugby union for Gala. He played for Gala from 1886 to 1896. He captained the club for three seasons. He also excelled in the Sevens game.

=== Provincial career ===
In a match for East of Scotland District against West of Scotland District he displayed his notable dribbling prowess. Twice he managed to dribble the length of the pitch.

He played for Provinces District against Cities District on 23 December 1893.

He was due to play for South of Scotland District in their match against Cumberland on 10 February 1894, however he was replaced by Renwick of Gala.

He did manage to play for the South of Scotland District in their match against North of Scotland District on 14 December 1895. South won the match 37-3 and 6 players from the South were selected for the Provinces District match against Cities District on 28 December 1895.

=== International career ===
He played 8 matches for Scotland from 1890 to 1894.

He was the first member of a Borders rugby club to be capped for Scotland.

A versatile forward, he was often instead called to play in the Backs if the match called for it. He had the distinction of playing every position for Scotland except Full Back.

=== Administrative career ===
On his playing retirement he went on the committee of the South of Scotland District Union and represented the South on the Scottish Rugby Union.

== Outside of rugby union ==
He was a President of the Gala Waverley Bowling Club.
