= Cameron Glasgow =

Scotland international rugby union player

Cammie Glasgow
- Born: Iain Cameron Glasgow; 24 February 1966 (age 60) Bridge of Allan, Scotland

Rugby union career
- Position: Full Back / Fly half
Amateur team(s)
Years	Team	Apps	(Points)
- Howe of Fife
–	University of St Andrews		
–	Edinburgh Wanderers		
–	Cambridge University		
–	Heriots		
Provincial / State sides
Years	Team	Apps	(Points)
- North and Midlands U21
-	Edinburgh District U21		
-	Anglo-Scots		
–	Edinburgh District		
International career
Years	Team	Apps	(Points)
1991	Scotland 'B'	1	
1994-97	Scotland 'A'	7	
1997	Scotland	1	(0)

Cameron "Cammy" Glasgow (24 February 1966, Bridge of Allan) is a former Scotland international rugby union player.

== Rugby Union career ==
=== Amateur career ===
He played for Howe of Fife. He helped the club win their own Sevens tournament in 1986, the first time since 1977. The Dundee Courier of 5 May 1986 reporting:

However, perhaps the biggest contribution was made by Cameron Glasgow in that for the first time in the sevens circuit Howe of Fife were able to call on genuine pace. The Scottish under-21 player had not been in the original seven. He was only in attendance for a team photograph and had intended returning to his residence in St Andrews to do some studying. He had scarcely, prepared himself for such exertions in that the previous evening, throughout the night and that very breakfast, as is the custom, he had attended the University Ball. A Corinthian story, if ever there was one.

He left the Cupar club on that season end in 1986.

He played for University of St Andrews while a student there and won the Scottish Universities championship with the side in 1988, ending the Fife university's 25-year wait for another title.

He moved south to study at Cambridge University and he turned out for Cambridge University rugby union side.

He played for Edinburgh Wanderers.

He also played for Heriots.

=== Provincial career ===
He played for North and Midlands Under 21 side while still with Howe of Fife.

He played in the trial side for a place in the Midlands District side in 1987.

When Glasgow moved to Cambridge he turned out for the Anglo-Scots.

On moving to play for Edinburgh Wanderers, he was selected for Edinburgh District Under 21s.

He was named as a replacement for Edinburgh District versus North and Midlands in 1993. He played for Edinburgh against North and Midlands and Glasgow District in 1994.

=== International career ===
He was named in the Scotland Under 21 squad in 1987 to play against Wales Under 21s when still playing for Edinburgh Wanderers. Glasgow was moved to cover fly-half in place of Carson Russell of Wasps.

He was picked for the Scottish Students to play in the Students World Cup in 1987. He played for the Scottish Students against the Scotland Under 21 side in 1989.

He was in the Scottish Universities side that beat the Army Under 21 35–9, with Glasgow scoring 19 points in the match.

Glasgow played in an uncapped Scotland XV side that played Japan in 1989. Japan won the match 28 - 24.

He was capped by Scotland 'B' to play against France 'B' in 1991. He was also selected to play against Ireland 'B' that same year but withdrew with illness.

He was capped by Scotland 'A' 7 times between 1994 and 1997.

He was capped by the Barbarians in their tour to Zimbabwe in 1994 and again in September 1995.

He was named as a replacement for Scotland in their matches against England and Canada in 1995 but not used.

He was capped once in 1997 for Scotland.

== Other sports ==
He was keen on athletics. In the 1987 Scottish Universities Athletic Championships Glasgow won the 110 metres hurdles with a time of 16.2 seconds; and won the javelin with a throw of 51.56 metres.

== Family ==
He is the son of Ronnie Glasgow, who was also capped for Scotland.
