= Dod Gray =

Scotland international rugby union & league footballer

Personal information
- Full name: George Leitch Gray
- Born: 12 April 1909; Galashiels, Scotland
- Died: 2 September 1975 (aged 66)

Playing information

Rugby union
- Position: Hooker
Club
Years	Team	Pld	T	G	FG	P
	Gala RFC	0	0	0	0	0
Representative
Years	Team	Pld	T	G	FG	P
1935–37	Scotland	0	0	0	0	0

Rugby league
- Position: Hooker
Club
Years	Team	Pld	T	G	FG	P
1937	Huddersfield	0	0	0	0	0
- As of 26 May 2021

George Leitch "Dod" Gray (12 April 1909 – 2 September 1975) was a Scottish rugby union, and professional rugby league footballer who played in the 1930s, who played at hooker.

== Rugby union ==
He was capped four times for Scotland in 1935–37. He also played for Gala RFC.

== Rugby league ==
Gray changed rugby football codes from rugby union to rugby league when he transferred to Huddersfield RLFC in 1937.
