= Ron Glasgow =

Scotland international rugby union player (1930–2024)

Ronnie Glasgow
- Born: Ronald James Cunningham Glasgow; 5 November 1930 Aberlady, Scotland
- Died: 6 October 2024 (aged 93) Dollar, Clackmannanshire, Scotland
- Notable relative(s): Cammie Glasgow, son

Rugby union career
- Position: Flanker
Amateur team(s)
Years	Team	Apps	(Points)
- Jordanhill
–	Gordonians		
–	Dunfermline		
–	Haddington		
Provincial / State sides
Years	Team	Apps	(Points)
	Glasgow District	6	
-	North and Midlands	21	
International career
Years	Team	Apps	(Points)
1962–65	Scotland	10	(9)

Ronald James Cunningham Glasgow, OBE (5 November 1930 – 6 October 2024) was a Scotland international rugby union player.

== Rugby Union career ==
=== Amateur career ===
Glasgow played for Dunfermline, and Gordonians, as well as Jordanhill and Haddington.

Allan Massie stated:

"It was his misfortune to play for unfashionable clubs: Jordanhill College, Gordonians and Dunfermline. I have no doubt that had he played for Hawick or Gala or one of the big city clubs he would have represented his country more often."

=== Provincial career ===
Glasgow was to represent two district sides. He played 21 times for North and Midlands and 6 times for Glasgow District.

=== International career ===
Glasgow was capped ten times between 1962 and 1965 for Scotland.

Allan Massie considers that:

"Ron Glasgow was the most under-capped Scottish forward, winning only ten caps between 1962 and 1965... Glasgow's performance at Cardiff [in 1962] alone should have ensured him of a long reign at open-side wing-forward.

Glasgow's try was the first Scottish one in Cardiff for 27 years.

Robin Lind (Harry?!) who played for Dunfermline and North and Midlands said "never, ever did I think my team would lose when Ron Glasgow played for us. And very seldom we did."

== Personal life and death ==
Glasgow was born in Aberlady in 1930, and attended Knox Academy. He served in the parachute platoon of the Scots Guards. He was PE teacher at Dollar Academy and head of the school cadet force. He was appointed OBE in the 1990 New Year Honours for his service with the Combined Cadet Force, in which he was a lieutenant colonel.

In 1958, he married his first wife, Anette, who died in 1962, from complications encountered in childbirth and cerebral palsy, shortly after the birth of their son. He then remarried, to Anne Fleming (died 1988), and they had twins, one of whom is Cammie Glasgow, who was also capped for Scotland. Glasgow was a Presbyterian.

Glasgow died in Dollar on 6 October 2024, at the age of 93.
