= Bob Cunningham (rugby union) =

Scotland international rugby union player

- Born: Robert Fraser Cunningham; 4 January 1953 (age 73) Musselburgh, Scotland

Rugby union career
- Position: Prop
Amateur team(s)
Years	Team	Apps	(Points)
- Preston Lodge
–	Gala		
Provincial / State sides
Years	Team	Apps	(Points)
1978-	South of Scotland District		
International career
Years	Team	Apps	(Points)
1978–79	Scotland	3	(0)

Bob Cunningham (born 4 January 1953 in Musselburgh, Scotland) is a former Scotland international rugby union player.

== Rugby Union career ==
He played for Preston Lodge.

He played for Gala.

He played for South of Scotland District; and was part of the 1978–79 Scottish Inter-District Championship winning side.

He had 3 caps for Scotland between 1978 and 1979.
