= Scott Murray (rugby union) =

Former Scottish rugby union player/current coach

- Born: 15 January 1976 (age 50) Musselburgh, East Lothian, Scotland
- Height: 1.98 m (6 ft 6 in)
- Weight: 113 kg (17 st 11 lb; 249 lb)
- School: Preston Lodge High School; Morgan Academy
- Occupation: Head Coach

Rugby union career
- Position: Lock
- Current team: Stade Montois
Senior career
Years	Team	Apps	(Points)
2012–	Stade Montois	10	
2010–2012	Castres	19	
2007–2010	US Montauban	46	(5)
2002–2007	Edinburgh	62	
1999–2002	Saracens	20	(15)
1996–1999	Bedford Blues		(0)
International career
Years	Team	Apps	(Points)
1997–2007	Scotland	87	(15)
2001	British & Irish Lions	0	(0)
1996–1997	Scotland A	9	

Scott Murray (born 15 January 1976) is a former rugby union player who played lock for Scotland. He was at one time the record caps holder for Scotland having represented them on 87 occasions, five of which as captain and playing at three Rugby World Cups. He also toured with the British & Irish Lions and won Scotland player of the season three times. He is the former head coach of the San Diego Legion of Major League Rugby (MLR).

== Club career ==
Murray is a former Scottish school basketball international who attended Morgan Academy and Preston Lodge High School. He represented Scotland at every youth level and has played for Preston Lodge RFC and Edinburgh Academicals before moving to England to help Bedford win the Allied Dunbar Premiership Division Two (now the RFU Championship) in 1998 and gain entrance to the English Premiership.

Murray went on to play for Saracens and Edinburgh before joining French team US Montauban following the 2007 Rugby World Cup. In July 2010 he joined Castres after Montauban were liquidated due to financial problems.

Murray left Castres in June 2012 to join newly promoted Mont-de-Marsan based side Stade Montois. In December, with two years still left on his playing contract, he was appointed as forwards coach following a reshuffle at the club that saw previous coach Marc Dantin moved to other duties. Mont-de-Marsan were relegated from the Top 14 at the end of the season finishing bottom of the table having only managed to win two games.

== National honours ==
Murray's debut for Scotland came against Australia on 22 November 1997 and he won the 1998–99 Scotland player of the season in the year when Scotland won the final Five Nations Championship. Since then he has won this honour a further two times in 2001–02 and 2002–03 and gained selection for the British & Irish Lions on their tour of Australia in 2001, although he did not feature in any of the full tests.

In the 2003 Rugby World Cup Countdown Test against Italy he captained the side from the start for the first time when he won his 50th cap.

Murray started all three Autumn Tests in November 2005 and became Scotland's most capped player of all time, when on 10 March 2007, he collected his 83rd Test cap, surpassing Gregor Townsend's previous record of 82 caps. He has collected another four caps since (the last being against the All Blacks in the 2007 Rugby World Cup) and held the national record until 14 June 2008, when Chris Paterson won his 88th cap.

Murray failed to make the initial 2008 Six Nations Championship squad, though he was later added but did not feature in any games.

== Low point ==
During the Six Nations Scotland v Wales game at the Millennium Stadium on 12 February 2006 Murray was sent off by referee Steve Walsh after he perceived that Murray retaliated by lashing out with his boot following a late tackle by Ian Gough. His sending off was seen as a decisive point in the game that Wales won 28–18.

Murray became only the second Scotland player ever to be sent off (the other being second row colleague Nathan Hines) and was subsequently banned for three weeks, after an unsuccessful appeal, meaning he would miss the upcoming Calcutta Cup game.

== Coaching career ==
In 2018 Murray took up a coaching role at San Diego Legion in the US Major League Rugby.
