= Gordonians RFC =

Scottish rugby union club, based in Aberdeen

(Scotland) Gordonians
- Full name: Gordonians Rugby Football Club
- Union: Scottish Rugby Union
- Founded: 1904; 122 years ago
- Location: Aberdeen, Scotland
- Ground: Countesswells
- League: Scottish National League Division Two
- 2025–26: Scottish National League Division One, 10th of 10 (relegated)
Team kit

Official website
- www.pitchero.com/clubs/gordonians

Gordonians RFC is a rugby union club based in Aberdeen, Scotland, founded in 1904. It takes its name from originally being the former pupils' club for Robert Gordon's College in the city. The team currently fields two squads: The 1st XV currently competes in the Scottish National League Division 2, the third tier of Scottish rugby, while the 2nd XV, nicknamed the "Jolly Boys", competes in the Caledonia North 2nd. league. The club also runs a youth division known as the Gordonian Pelicans.

== History ==
=== Formation (1904-1960s) ===
Founded in 1904–05, Gordonians RFC was originally a club exclusively for the former pupils of Robert Gordon's College. Despite this, the club was able to establish itself with several of its players appearing in international matches. Bert Bruce was the first, representing Scotland against Australia at Murrayfield in 1947. Later caps were won by Donald MacDonald, Ron Glasgow, and Ian McCrae, further increasing the reputation of the club.

Throughout the late 1950s and the 1960s, Gordonians saw improvement in its fixture list and contributed actively in the development of the sport in the North East of Scotland. Gordon Hill (1961) and Ian Spence (1963–64) played for the Barbarians in 1965. The player base and management structure of the 1960s took the club into the 1970s in a strong position.

=== Success in the National Leagues (1970s-1990s) ===
Having established themselves as a prominent team in the 1960s, Gordonians underwent many changes in the 1970s with the introduction in 1973 of the Scottish National Leagues. The Gordonians reputation secured them a spot in the third tier of the new 6 Division system for the inaugural 1973–74 season. Their time in Division III was brief, as they gained an immediate promotion to Division II. In the 1974–75 season the club ceased to be exclusively for the former pupils of Robert Gordon's College; allowing anyone to join for the first time. The club then began to introduce a more committed approach to training and retained a consistent pool of players. This allowed them to begin fielding 2nd and 3rd XVs, which established them at the head of the Midland League and Aberdeen District League. In the season of 1978–79, seven Gordonians played for the North Midlands side against a touring New Zealand side proving the club had the player base necessary to compete at the highest level. This would result in the 1st XV being promoted to the First Division of the Scottish Premiership for the 1979–80 season.

The season of 1980–81 proved one of the club's most successful. The long-awaited arrival of Hawick at Seafield for the club's first ever Division I match was greeted by a crowd of approximately 1500 spectators. The Gordonians reached an early lead and finished the match with a score of 26–13. After the first eight matches in Division I, they stood third in the table, finishing the season in sixth place. The success was celebrated by a touring party of 38 players to Whitley Bay for a three-match tour for 1st and 3rd XV's.

The 1981–82 season, by contrast, saw the club unable to continue its earlier success. Injuries to key players and an overall increase in the players' age all contributed to a poor season, with the side ending up in the second-to-last place of the league. Season 1982–83 was a challenging season for the club, with many young and inexperienced players being fielded to fill gaps. The increased distance between matches also had an impact. In the top division, they had to play a number of matches against Borders sides, a round trip of about 300 miles. This distance appears to have taken its toll. For example, in that season, they were defeated by Hawick RFC, 102–4, and a week later, by Gala RFC, approximately 112–4. After a second poor season, the Gordonians were relegated back to Division II.

1983–84 was mainly a season of consolidation, finishing 6th in Division II. The 3rd XV also won the Aberdeen and District League. Consolidation was short-lived, with the club finishing bottom of Division II in 1984–85. The club would see several stagnant seasons in Division III where it appeared that further relegation may have been threatening, but in the 1988–89 season, Colin Manders’ side was promoted to Division II after a great run of victories in the second half of the season. The reverse in fortunes was only temporary, however, and the club was relegated the following season and finished 9th in Division III the season after. The 1991-92 and 1992-93 seasons saw narrow escapes from relegation in the last games of each season; then the club was promoted back to Division II.

Several poor seasons and a restructuring of the league system would see Gordonians fall to Premier Division 4 for the 1995-96 season. This season saw Rugby Union turn professional, a controversial move that was resisted by Gordonians, who retain their amateur status to this day.

=== Resignation and Return to the National League (1990s-present) ===
The 1996–97 season would see all three squads win their respective leagues, again placing the 1st XV in the third division. They would miss out on promotion for the following season, which, combined with the changing landscape of Scottish rugby, left them struggling to attract players. A successful cup run would see Gordonians appear at Murrayfield for the final of the Scottish Rugby Shield in 1999, but they lost to Jed-Forest R.F.C..

After this, the club continued to slip down the leagues with a lack of sustained success. The decision not to turn professional, together with a dwindling number of players coming from Robert Gordon's College led to the club struggling to maintain an identity and a reliable team. The decision was made to resign from the Scottish League Championship and from 2003 to play within the North District Leagues. This allowed the team to consolidate and ensure its short term survival.

Over the next decade, the squad would progress through regional leagues, being briefly promoted to the National Leagues in 2008 before yet more restructuring relegated them back to regional status in 2012. One of the many reasons to the changing fortunes at this time was a renewed partnership with Robert Gordon's College. As more students remained in Aberdeen and were available for the club, so too did former students return to play. The slow rebuilding of the club in the 2016-17 season enabled the 1st XV beat Strathmore in the Caledonia Regional Shield and then to win the Caledonia Regional League 1 title. This enabled them to return to the National Leagues, [1 where they remain, currently competing in the National League Division 2.

== Honours ==
- Aberdeenshire Sevens
  - Champions (1): 1994
- Aberdeen Sevens
  - Champions (1): 1960
- Deeside Sevens
  - Champions (1): 2016
- North of Scotland District Sevens
  - Champions (2): 1938, 1960
- Aberdeen and District League Sevens
  - Champions (1): 1998
- Mackie Academy F.P. Sevens
  - Champions (1): 1978
- Highland Sevens
  - Champions (4): 1961, 1962, 1965, 1992
- Dundee HSFP Sevens
  - Champions (5): 1963, 1964, 1965, 1966, 1973
- Ross Sutherland Sevens
  - Champions (4): 1958, 1960, 1964, 1959
- Garioch Sevens
  - Champions (1): 1987
- Moray Sevens
  - Champions (11): 1936, 1938, 1954, 1960, 1961, 1962, 1965, 1970, 1978, 1979, 1998
- Caledonia Sevens
  - Champions: 2022

== Notable players ==
- Andrew McInnes
- Ron Glasgow
