= P. J. Solomon =

Scotland international rugby league & union footballer

P J Solomon
Personal information
- Full name: Pehi James Solomon
- Born: 17 August 1976 (age 49) Porirua, New Zealand

Playing information

Rugby union
Club
Years	Team	Pld	T	G	FG	P
	Gala RFC	0	0	0	0	0
	Edinburgh Academicals	0	0	0	0	0
	Total	0	0	0	0	0

Rugby league
- Position: Centre
Club
Years	Team	Pld	T	G	FG	P
1998	Lancashire Lynx	0	0	0	0	0
2004	Doncaster R.L.F.C.	0	0	0	0	0
	Total	0	0	0	0	0
Representative
Years	Team	Pld	T	G	FG	P
1997–03	Scotland	5	0	0	0	0
- As of 3 Oct 2021

Pehi James "PJ" Solomon is a former international rugby player from Porirua, New Zealand. With eligibility via his mother from Kirkcaldy, he represented Scotland at rugby league. Solomon played as a centre.

== Union ==
Solomon played club rugby union in Scotland for Gala RFC and Edinburgh Academicals.

== League ==
He played rugby league in England for Lancashire Lynx and Doncaster and played internationally for Scotland in the Rugby League European Cup. He was part of the side that played against France in the 2003 game in Narbonne, needing to win by five points to qualify for the final. Solomon and his teammates won 8–6 and so were eliminated from the competition at that stage.

== Off the pitch ==
Solomon is married with one son and one daughter. His wife is the sister of Estonian professional basketballer, Heiko Niidas. Solomon works in the construction industry.
