= Brian Shillinglaw =

Scotland international rugby union & league footballer

Personal information
- Full name: Robert Brian Shillinglaw
- Born: 1 July 1939; Scotland
- Died: 17 October 2007 (aged 68); Melrose, Scottish Borders, Scotland

Playing information

Rugby union
- Position: Scrum-half
Club
Years	Team	Pld	T	G	FG	P
	Gala RFC	65	14	2
Representative
Years	Team	Pld	T	G	FG	P
1960–61	Scotland	5	0	0	0	0

Rugby league
- Position: Scrum-half
Club
Years	Team	Pld	T	G	FG	P
1961–62	Whitehaven
1962–65	Wigan	42	25	0	0	75
1966/67–66/67	Leigh	3	0	0	0	0
	Total	45	25	0	0	75
Representative
Years	Team	Pld	T	G	FG	P
1965	Other Nationalities	1
- Source: ESPN

Robert Brian Shillinglaw (1 July 1939 – 17 October 2007), also known by the nickname of "Shill", was a Scottish rugby union and professional rugby league footballer who played in the 1950s and 1960s. He played representative level rugby union (RU) for Scotland, and at club level for Gala RFC, and representative level rugby league (RL) for Other Nationalities, and at club level for Whitehaven, Wigan and Leigh. Shillinglaw served with the King's Own Scottish Borderers.

== Playing career ==
=== Rugby union ===
He was capped five times for Scotland in 1960–61. He also played for Gala RFC, for whom he played sixty five times, scoring fourteen tries.

=== Rugby league ===
Shillinglaw transferred to Whitehaven in 1961. He was then signed by Wigan in 1962 for a transfer fee of £5,500. He went on to score 25 tries in 42 appearances for Wigan. Shillinglaw also played for Leigh.

Shillinglaw represented Other Nationalities (RL) while at Wigan, he played scrum-half in the 2–19 defeat by St. Helens at Knowsley Road, St. Helens on Wednesday 27 January 1965, to mark the switching-on of new floodlights.

== Personal life ==
Shillinglaw was a bricklayer by trade, and was offered the sum of £5,000 to defect to rugby league for Whitehaven in 1961 (based on increases in average earnings, this would be approximately £233,100 in 2016).

== Death ==
Shillinglaw died aged 68 in Borders General Hospital, Melrose, Scottish Borders.
