= Pennypit Park =

Sports complex in Prestonpans, Scotland

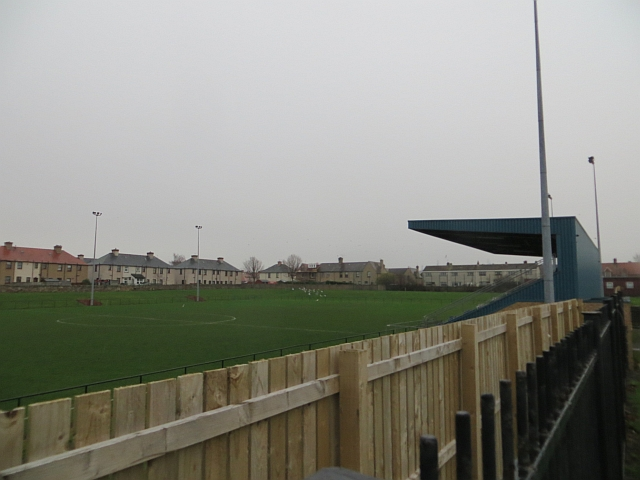

- Location in East Lothian
- Location: Prestonpans, East Lothian, Scotland
- Coordinates: 55°57′26″N 2°59′11″W
- Capacity: 1,500 (313 seated)
- Surface: Grass

Tenants
- Preston Athletic F.C. Preston Lodge RFC

Pennypit Park is a sports complex located in the town of Prestonpans, East Lothian in Scotland. It consists of two sports fields, one for association football and the other rugby union. It is the home of East of Scotland Football League club Preston Athletic F.C. and rugby union club Preston Lodge RFC. It has a capacity of 1,500 with 313 seats.

== History ==
Pennypit Park was constructed after Preston Links Park was bought by the South of Scotland Electricity Board in order to build Cockenzie power station. In return, Pennypit Park was constructed over an old coal pit dating to 1202. The name came from miners in the area who were earning a penny a shift working there so it became known as "The Penny Pit". The pitch was planted in the 1950s. In the 1970s, Preston Lodge RFC and East Lothian District Council paid for a new pavilion and rugby pitch to be constructed. In 1992, with Pennypit Park in need of renovations, the Pennypit Community Trust was set up and raised £500,000 for redevelopment. The redevelopment was completed in 1994. The ground has been used to host the Scotland Development XV rugby team and Rugby tens.

Preston Lodge used to have their clubhouse at Pennypit Park following the sale of their old clubhouse at Rope Walk. In 2013, they moved their social space from Pennypit Park to Prestongrange Bowling Club after purchasing their clubhouse. In 2013, a Scottish Cup match between Preston Athletic and Queen's Park was abandoned by fans throwing smoke bombs. In 2016, the stadium was vandalised with graffiti on the stand and beer bottles thrown on the pitch.
