= Preston Lodge High School =

Coordinates: 55°57′32″N 2°58′9″W

Location
- Park View; Prestonpans, East Lothian, EH32 9QJ; Scotland

Information
- Type: Comprehensive
- Religious affiliation: Non-denominational
- Established: 1924
- Local authority: East Lothian Council
- Head teacher: Gavin Clark
- Staff: c.500
- Enrolment: c.3,000
- Houses: Gosford; Grange; Seton
- Colour
- Publication: PLus
- Website: www.prestonlodge.net

Preston Lodge High School is a six-year non-denominational school located in Prestonpans, Scotland. It serves students from Cockenzie, Port Seton, Prestonpans, Longniddry, Blindwells and the surrounding areas.

A view of Preston Lodge from the main entrance

== Primary Schools ==
A student goes to Preston Lodge High School when they finish P7 at primary school. The primary schools in the Preston Lodge catchment area are Preston Tower Primary School (formerly Prestonpans Primary School), St Gabriel's RC Primary School, Longniddry Primary School, and Cockenzie Primary School.

== House system ==
Every pupil who goes to Preston Lodge High School is sorted into one of three houses, which takes place at random (unless they have an older sibling(s) already assigned to a house, in which case they go to the same one):

- Gosford - which hosts the Gosford House.
- Seton - which hosts the Seton Fishing Harbour.
- Grange - which hosts the Prestongrange Mines.

== Notable events ==
The original school situated on Preston Road (the site of the current Preston Tower Primary School) burnt down in January 1967. A new school was built at Park View and formally opened on 14 November 1969 by the late John P Mackintosh, MA.

The school building was extended and modernised in 2006. This included a re-shuffle of departments like the Support for Learning (SFL) and Pupil Support classes as well as more rooms for subjects such as Modern Studies, etc.

== Notable former pupils ==
- John Bellany, painter
- Jane Connachan, golfer
- Allan Jacobsen, rugby player
- Scott Murray, rugby player
- John Taylor, boxer
