= Scottish National League (rugby union) =

Scottish sports league

- Sport: Rugby union
- Founded: 1973
- No. of teams: 40 (over four leagues)
- Country: Scotland

The Scottish National League (currently named Tennent's National League for sponsorship reasons) is an amateur league structure for rugby union clubs in Scotland. It currently forms the 2nd tier to the 5th tiers of the Scottish League Championship for Scotland's amateur clubs.

== History ==
The Scottish National Leagues are the leagues below the Scottish Premiership. The national leagues takes teams for all over Scotland. Teams from the Premiership are relegated to the highest tier of the National Leagues, Scottish National League Division One. Teams can also be promoted to the Premiership from this league.

Below this national league set-up, beyond the lowest national league, currently Scottish National League Division Four, the leagues are split into Regional Leagues.

The Scottish National Leagues ran to three national leagues below the Premiership until the 2022–23 season.

However, a play-off system to increase the leagues was introduced in 2022–23, and a fourth national tier was introduced in the 2023–24 season.

== See also ==
Each national league has its own article.

- Scottish National League Division One
- Scottish National League Division Two
- Scottish National League Division Three
- Scottish National League Division Four
