= Preston Lodge RFC =

Scottish rugby union club, based in Prestonpans, East Lothian

(Scotland) Preston Lodge RFC
- Full name: Preston Lodge Former Pupils Rugby Football Club
- Union: Scottish Rugby Union
- Founded: 1929; 97 years ago
- Location: Prestonpans, Scotland
- Ground: Pennypit Park
- League: Scottish National League Division Two
- 2025–26: Scottish National League Division Three, 1st of 10 (promoted)
Team kit

Official website
- www.pitchero.com/clubs/prestonlodgefp

Preston Lodge Former Pupil Rugby Football Club is a rugby union club based in Prestonpans in East Lothian, Scotland. Formed in 1929, they currently play in Scottish National League Division Two.

== History ==
The club formed in 1929–30 with Dr. Boyle as its first president and originates from the roots of Preston Lodge High School, formed in 1924. This connection is still going strong today. The club fields teams at every age group Primary 1–7, Secondary 1–3, under-16, under-18. As well as fielding two senior XV's. The Club has formed links over the years with United Pirates – a club in New Zealand and Balmy Beach rugby club in Toronto, Canada. This has allowed for the exchange of players and coaching techniques.

A number of PLRFC players have played age group rugby for Scotland and gaining many caps for their country. The most recent and successful players to do this are Scott Murray and Allan Jacobsen, both played for Edinburgh and Scotland.

Preston Lodge RFC Defeated Dalziel RFC To Win The SHE Bowl At Murrayfield in May 2008.

In the 2013-2014 season, PL went undefeated, winning 18 out of 18 games, culminating in them winning the East Regional Division 1 Championship.

In 2014–15 PL gained promotion for the third season running, finishing 2nd in BT National League Three and gaining automatic promotion to BT National League Two for the 2015–16 season.

== Sides ==
Preston Lodge play at Pennypit Park in Prestonpans and are currently fielding two teams each week.

== Preston Lodge Sevens ==
The club run the Preston Lodge Sevens tournament.

== Notable players ==
- Bob Cunningham
- Allan Jacobsen
- Scott Murray

== Honours ==
- Preston Lodge Sevens
  - Champions (2): 1988, 1995
- Peebles Sevens
  - Champions (2): 1981, 1994
- Walkerburn Sevens
  - Champions (1): 1997
- Ellon Sevens
  - Champions (1): 1993
- Penicuik Sevens
  - Champions (7): 1965, 1966, 1967, 1968, 1973, 1976, 2015
- Haddington Sevens
  - Champions (4): 1963, 1964, 1990, 1996
- Edinburgh District Sevens
  - Champions (6): 1961, 1962, 1963, 1964, 1965, 1966
- Musselburgh Sevens
  - Champions (1): 1989
- Kirkcaldy Sevens
  - Champions (1): 1976
- North Berwick Sevens
  - Champions (4): 1961, 1968, 1972, 1974
