= Scottish National League Division One =

Rugby union league division

- Formerly: National League, Premiership Division Two
- Sport: Rugby union
- Founded: 1973
- No. of teams: 10
- Country: Scotland
- Most recent champion: Edinburgh Academical (4th title)
- Most titles: Kelso and Stirling County (5 titles)
- Level on pyramid: 2
- Promotion to: Premiership
- Relegation to: National League Division Two
- Domestic cup: Scottish Cup

The Scottish National League Division One (known as Arnold Clark National League Division 1 for sponsorship reasons) is the second tier of the Scottish League Championship for amateur rugby union clubs in Scotland.

The division was established in its current format in 2014, with the creation of three national leagues below the Premiership.

For the 2023–24 season, the division was reduced from 12 to 10 teams.

== Promotion and Relegation ==
The winners are promoted to the Premiership and the runners-up compete in a play-off match with 9th in the Premiership, while the bottom team is relegated to National League Division Two.

== 2026–27 Teams ==
Location of teams in 2026-27 Scottish National League Division One

Departing were Edinburgh Accies, promoted to the Scottish Premiership while Gordonians were relegated to National League Division Two.

Joining were Selkirk, relegated from Scottish Premiership and GHK, promoted from National League Division Two.

Team	Ground	Location	2025–26
Biggar	Hartree Mill	Biggar	9th
Boroughmuir	Meggetland	Edinburgh	6th
Gala	Netherdale	Galashiels	7th
Glasgow Academicals	New Anniesland	Glasgow	3rd
GHK	Old Anniesland	Glasgow	Promoted (1st)
Jed-Forest	Riverside Park	Jedburgh	8th
Marr	Fullarton Park	Troon	4th
Musselburgh	Stoneyhill	Musselburgh	5th
Selkirk	Philiphaugh	Selkirk	Relegated (10th)
Stirling County	Bridgehaugh Park	Stirling	2nd

== Past winners ==
Winners of the Scottish League Championship second tier competition – includes National League Division Two (1973–1995), Premiership Division Two (1996–2012), National League (2013–14) and National League Division One (2015–present)

National League Division Two

1974. Kelso
1975. Langholm
1976. Selkirk
1977. Melrose
1978. Kelso
1979. Melrose
1980. Gordonians
1981. Selkirk
1982. Kilmarnock
1983. Ayr
1984. Glasgow Academicals
1985. Kilmarnock
1986. Glasgow Academicals
1987. Kilmarnock
1988. Jed-Forest
1989. Stirling County
1990. Edinburgh Wanderers
1991. Watsonians
1992. Kelso
1993. West Of Scotland
1994. Glasgow High Kelvinside
1995. Kelso

Premiership Division Two

1996. Currie
1997. Edinburgh Academical
1998. Glasgow Hawks
1999. Gala
2000. Boroughmuir
2001. Stirling County
2002. Peebles
2003. Watsonians
2004. Gala
2005. Stirling County
2006. Dundee HSFP
2007. Stirling County
2008. West Of Scotland
2009. Dundee HSFP
2010. Stirling County
2011. Edinburgh Academical (split format)
2012. Jed-Forest

National League

2013. Glasgow Hawks
2014. Boroughmuir

National League Division 1

2015. Selkirk
2016. Watsonians
2017. Marr
2018. Edinburgh Academical
2019. Marr
2020. Null and void
2021. No competition
2022. Heriot's Blues
2023. Kelso
2024. Ayr
2025. GHA
2026. Edinburgh Academical
