= Newton Stewart RFC =

- Full name: Newton Stewart Rugby Football Club
- Founded: 1984
- Location: Bladnoch, Wigtownshire, Scotland
- Ground(s): Bladnoch Park
- League(s): Scottish National League Division Two
- 2021–22: Scottish National League Division Two, 4th of 12
Team kit

Official website
- www.pitchero.com/clubs/newtonstewartrugbyfootballclub

Newton Stewart RFC is a rugby union club based in Bladnoch, Wigtownshire, Scotland. The men's team plays in Scottish National League Division Two.

== History ==
The club was founded in 1984 by rugby players from the Machars area of Wigtownshire.

The club plays an annual derby match with Wigtownshire RFC for the Spice Cup.

The second XV plays for the Galloway Quaich.

== Sides ==
Newton Stewart runs various men's, women's, and age-group boys' and girls' sides.

== Newton Stewart Sevens ==
The club runs the Newton Stewart Sevens tournament. Teams play for the Bladnoch Quaich.

== Honours ==
- Scottish National League Division Two
  - Runners-up: 2022–23
- Glasgow District League
  - Champions (1): 1996-97
- Newton Stewart Sevens
  - Champions (1): 2018
- Leith Sevens
  - Champions (2): 2022, 2023

== Notable former player ==
- Robbie Smith represented Glasgow Warriors at professional level.
