= Dumfries Rugby Club =

Scottish rugby union club, based in Dumfries

Dumfries Saints
- Full name: Dumfries Saints Rugby Football Club
- Founded: 1901; 125 years ago
- Location: Dumfries, Scotland
- Ground: Park Farm
- League: Scottish National League Division Three
- 2025–26: Scottish National League Division Three, 2nd of 10
Team kit

Official website
- www.dumfriessaintsrugby.co.uk

Dumfries Saints RFC is a rugby union club based in Dumfries, Scotland. The team currently plays in Scottish National League Division Two, the third tier of Scottish club rugby.

== History ==
The first rugby club from Dumfries to be admitted to the SRU was Dumfries Rangers in 1876–77. The club re-emerged in 1901 as Dumfries (without the 'Rangers') and after a lapse was re-admitted to the SRU in 1923 as Dumfries RFC.

The club played at Downfield until 1939 and then at Marchfield and Summerhill. Then came a major turning point in 1953 when the club negotiated a deal to play at Park Farm.

The name Dumfries Saints was adopted to reflect the link to Saint Michael and the town crest which has always been used by the club.

== Dumfries Sevens ==
The club run the Dumfries Sevens. Teams play for the Dumfries Challenge Cup.

== Honours ==
- Scottish National League Division Three (fourth tier)
  - Champions: 2016-17
- National League Cup: 2017–18
- Newton Stewart Sevens: 2009
- Irvine Sevens: 1981
- Cumnock Sevens: 1989
- Stewartry Sevens: 1979, 1980, 1983, 1985, 1986, 1987, 1990
- Wigtownshire Sevens: 1959, 1961, 1962, 1963, 1964, 1980, 1982, 2015
- Glasgow Warriors Community Club of the Season: 2017–18

== Notable former players ==
=== Scotland internationalists ===
The following former Dumfries Saints players have represented Scotland at full international level.

- (Scotland) Scott Steele
- (Scotland) Stafford McDowall
