= Greenock Wanderers RFC =

Scottish rugby union club, based in Greenock

(Scotland) Greenock Wanderers
- Founded: 1873
- Location: Greenock, Scotland
- Ground: Fort Matilda
- President: Kevin Murray
- Captain(s): Martin Lavelle; Beverly Addison
- League(s): Men: West Division One; Women: Scottish Women's West One
- 2025–26: Men: West Division One, 8th of 10; Women: Scottish Women's West One, 4th of 7
Team kit

Official website
- www.gwrfc.co.uk

Greenock Wanderers R.F.C. is a rugby union club based in Greenock, Scotland. The men's 1st XV side currently compete in the West Division One; the women's side currently compete in the Scottish Women's West One.

== History ==
Greenock Wanderers Rugby Football Club is one of the oldest clubs in Scotland, one of its earliest constituents been formed in 1873 as The Wanderers.

The Wanderers started off as a rugby union side, but in 1877 they decided to play association football for the 1877–78 season. The club was struggling with membership numbers and it was no doubt easier to field 11 players for association football for the season than the 15 required for rugby union.

=== Merger ===
The Wanderers club remained low on members in 1878; but it did have a 'good field' in Drums Park. It precipitated a merger with Greenock West End; a rugby union club in the town, with many members but no home. The new club took on the colours of Greenock West End: black, red and yellow. A vote was taken on this: and the 50 or so members of West End out-voted the 20 members of The Wanderers. The new club - as Greenock Wanderers - thus began in 1878; and as a result of the superior West End vote was now playing under rugby union rules.

=== Greenock Wanderers ===
A new clubhouse was opened in 2008 after extensive work projects, providing top-notch hospitality to home and away supporters. The clubhouse was officially opened by The Princess Royal.

=== Fort Matilda Playing Fields ===
The Fort Matilda Playing Fields Union celebrated the Centenary of the opening of their grounds at Fort Matilda on 30 April 2022, a centenary game was played to celebrate between a Greenock Wanderers Select team and Glasgow High Kelvinside(GHK), this was to replicate the original opening fixture played at the grounds in 1922 between Greenock Wanderers and the then known Kelvinside Academicals now known as GHK.

The creation of the sports fields was due almost entirely to the hard work of Greenock Wanderers’ first President of the 20th Century, W. E. Buchannan who worked tirelessly to develop what was initially known as the West End Recreation Ground.

The fields had been part of Hawkhead Farm and were used extensively by the MOD during the First World War. In 1922 they were Feued to the Union by Sir Michael Hugh Shaw Stewart (8th Bart) and became known as the Fort Matilda Playing Fields. First to open was the Fort Matilda Lawn Tennis Club on 28 April 1922 with their southerly courts facing Newark Street. Greenock Wanderers, having secured a loan of £975 from the SRU to develop the two rugby pitches, had their opening match against Kelvinside Academicals on Saturday 14 October that year. The Bowling Club took a little longer to lay their green and it didn't officially open until 1925.

The original Feu Contract containing the Feu Disposition, signed between Sir Michael Hugh Shaw Stewart and the Trustees of the Fort Matilda Playing Fields Union on 2 January 1925, remains the principal legal document defining the conditions and use of the fields. As part of the SRU loan, it was decreed that Association Football would not be played on the fields!

From the opening of their pitches, the Wanderers used the old ‘Tin-Shed’ on top of the hill at Wood Street as their changing rooms. This was the last remaining Army structure on the site after it had been requisitioned by the MOD in 1914. The Tennis and Bowling clubhouses were positioned much as they are now, facing Newark Street.

In addition, The Fort Matilda Club owned the substantial property at 79 Octavia Terrace - the one on the right of the photograph. The upkeep of this building proved to be too expensive and as the Wanderers were unable to take it on themselves, it was decided to wind up the club and sell off the property. As a result, the house was sold in 1967 for the development of the flats at Whitehill House.

However, the Wanderers had by then raised sufficient funds to develop a prefabricated clubhouse on the fields. This was opened on 27 January 1968 when they hosted Glasgow High School FPs and by then the old ‘Tin-Shed’ had been demolished. The Wanderers had agreed that the other members of the old Fort Matilda Club, including the Fort Matilda Bridge Club, could use their new Clubhouse. This arrangement did not last long and after a somewhat nomadic existence, the FMBC finally settled in its current location at Tarbet Street, Gourock but retained the name of The Fort Matilda Bridge Club.

=== Teams ===
It consists of 1st XV, 2nd XV, Women's 1st XV and Women's 2nd XV development side, under-18, under-15, S2 and S1 plus a complete Mini section; a mini rugby tournament is organised every year. They won the 2009–10 Scottish National League Division Two losing only one game and thus being promoted to the Scottish National League Division One that year.

The Men's 1st XV is once more competing with clubs in Scotland in the National League Division 3, the Men's 2nd XV are once against competing in the West Reserve League 2 division. The clubs is supported by a Youth Program spanning ages 3 to 17.

In 2014 a Women's section was formed. In 2018 the Women's section were BT Women's National Plate Finalists. In 2019 the Women's team successfully won the National Bowl Finals at Murrayfield defeating Livingston 72 - 12. In 2022 the Women's team again made it to the National Bowl finals to defend their title after the break of play due to covid, they competed against Cartha Queens Park 2nd XV in that final and narrowly lost out with a score line of 29–22.

== Greenock Sevens ==
The club runs the Greenock Sevens tournament. Established in 1948, entrants play for the Fort Matilda Cup.

== Notable former players ==
=== British and Irish Lions ===
- James Reid-Kerr he also played cricket for Scotland.

=== Scotland Internationalists ===
- (Scotland) James Reid-Kerr
- Lawrence Harvey - Scotland, 1899

=== Other Internationalists ===
- James Bridie, Scotland-born Wales international.

=== Glasgow District players ===
- (Scotland) J. G. Paton
- (Scotland) J. B. McDougall
- (Scotland) D. E. Mitchell
- (Scotland) C.J. Collie
- (Scotland) G.N. McKenzie
- (Scotland) M. R. McKechnie
- (Scotland) W. C. Lang
- (Scotland) J. Kerr
- (Scotland) Lawrence Harvey
- (Scotland) James Reid-Kerr
- (Scotland) J. Cassells

== Honours ==
- Greenock Sevens
  - Champions: 1950, 1964, 1981, 1997, 2014, 2015
- McLaren HSFP Sevens
  - Champions: 1993
- Craigielea Sevens
  - Champions: 1974
- Helensburgh Sevens
  - Champions: 2009, 2012
- Lenzie Sevens
  - Champions: 1975, 1976, 1978, 1979
- Ayr Sevens
  - Champions: 1950
- Scottish National League Division Two
  - Champions: 2009-10
- West Division One
  - Champions: 2018-19
