= Scottish League Championship =

- Organiser(s): SRU
- Founded: 1973; 53 years ago
- Region: Scotland
- Teams: 12
- Domestic cup: Scottish Cup
- Current champions: Ayr RFC (2024-25)
- Most championships: Hawick (13 titles)
- Website: fixtures.scottishrugby.org/club-rugby
- 2024–25 Scottish League Championship

The Scottish League Championship is the domestic rugby union league system within Scotland. Operated by the Scottish Rugby Union, the championship was founded in 1973 as the first formalised national league system within any home nations country.

The new six division championship replaced the haphazard Scottish Unofficial Championship that had been in operation until that time. The new top division is the Scottish Premiership.

Traditionally the championship has been dominated by teams from the Borders region, the sport's hotbed of popularity in Scotland. This is illustrated by the most successful clubs in the championships history, with Hawick RFC possessing 13 titles and Melrose RFC currently holding eight titles.

== History ==
For the history of the League championship before the 1973–74 season see:

The Scottish Rugby Union created a formal six division championship from the 1973–74 season, the first within any home nations country. The union's full member clubs were allocated into the new divisions, an arrangement that suited some of the 'open' clubs but many of the older former pupils clubs found it difficult to compete successfully and were forced into going 'open' themselves in an attempt to attract the better players. The new open clubs retained their FP or Academical names and continued to play on school owned grounds whilst those who persisted with their founding membership rules declined or disappeared altogether. The Championship's impact on the national team was quickly apparent; with fewer players being selected from English clubs to represent Scotland. For the first time since the First World War, the domestic game was strong enough to produce an adequate number of players of genuine international class.

The early decades of Championship rugby were dominated by Hawick who were crowned champions for 10 of the first 14 seasons. Heriot’s FP became the first 'Former Pupil' and 'City' club to win the Championship in 1979, they had already attracted "outsiders"; their leading try-scorer was Bill Gammell, a Fettesian already capped by the Scotland national rugby union team while playing for Edinburgh Wanderers. The first twenty years of Championship rugby saw large crowds and continued success, this period is largely considered the peak of domestic rugby union within Scotland to date. The early dominance of clubs in the Scottish Borders has faded in recent years with the rise of clubs from the Central Belt; especially Glasgow Hawks and Ayr RFC.

During the Championships forty-year history the Scottish Rugby Union and its member clubs have re-organised the competition several times, usually revolving around the number of participants in certain divisions. A complementary knock-out cup competition was introduced from 1995 with Border clubs again dominating the competition, starting with Hawick defeating Watsonians in the inaugural final.

== Championship and Cup winners ==
Ed.	Season	Championship Winners	Cup Winners
1	1973–74	Hawick (1)	
2	1974–75	Hawick (2)	
3	1975–76	Hawick (3)	
4	1976–77	Hawick (4)	
5	1977–78	Hawick (5)	
6	1978–79	Heriot's (1)	
7	1979–80	Gala (1)	
8	1980–81	Gala (2)	
9	1981–82	Hawick (6)	
10	1982–83	Gala (3)	
11	1983–84	Hawick (7)	
12	1984–85	Hawick (8)	
13	1985–86	Hawick (9)	
14	1986–87	Hawick (10)	
15	1987–88	Kelso (1)	
16	1988–89	Kelso (2)	
17	1989–90	Melrose (1)	
18	1990–91	Boroughmuir (1)	
19	1991–92	Melrose (2)	
20	1992–93	Melrose (3)	
21	1993–94	Melrose (4)	
22	1994–95	Stirling County	
23	1995–96	Melrose (5)	Hawick
24	1996–97	Melrose (6)	Melrose
25	1997–98	Watsonians	Glasgow Hawks
26	1998–99	Heriot's (2)	Gala
27	1999–00	Heriot's (3)	Boroughmuir
28	2000–01	Hawick (11)	Boroughmuir
29	2001–02	Hawick (12)	Hawick
30	2002–03	Boroughmuir (2)	Heriot's
31	2003–04	Glasgow Hawks (1)	Glasgow Hawks
32	2004–05	Glasgow Hawks (2)	Boroughmuir
33	2005–06	Glasgow Hawks (3)	Watsonians
34	2006–07	Currie (1)	Glasgow Hawks
35	2007–08	Boroughmuir (3)	Melrose
36	2008–09	Ayr (1)	Heriot's
37	2009–10	Currie (2)	Ayr
38	2010–11	Melrose (7)	Ayr
39	2011–12	Melrose (8)	Gala
40	2012–13	Ayr (2)	Ayr
41	2013–14	Melrose (9)	Heriot's
42	2014–15	Heriot's (4)	Boroughmuir
43	2015–16	Heriot's (5)	Heriot's
44	2016–17	Ayr (3)	Melrose
45	2017–18	Melrose (10)	Melrose
46	2018–19	Ayr (4)	Ayr
–	2019–20	(cancelled)	(cancelled)
–	2020–21	(cancelled)	(cancelled)
47	2021–22	Marr	(cancelled)
48	2022–23	Hawick (13)	Hawick
49	2023–24	Currie (3)	Hawick

== Championship titles by club ==
Rank	Club	Titles
1	Hawick	13
2	Melrose	10
3	Heriot's	5
4	Ayr	3
4	Boroughmuir	3
4	Gala	3
4	Glasgow Hawks	3
4	Currie	3
5	Kelso	2
6	Stirling County	1
6	Watsonians	1

== Scottish Cup titles by club ==
Rank	Club	Titles
1	Ayr	4
1	Boroughmuir	4
1	Heriot's	4
1	Melrose	4
2	Glasgow Hawks	3
2	Hawick	3
3	Gala	2
4	Watsonians	1

== Leagues not part of the Scottish League Championship ==
Certain leagues are not included in the system:

- The Border League, a historic and now supplementary competition involving clubs competing in the Championship
- The Grampian Alliance League, independent of the Championship (involving some 2nd XVs)
- The Highland Alliance League, also independent of the Championship (involving some 2nd XVs)

In addition, competitive rugby at universities, and rugby for 2nd and 3rd XVs, is organised separately, and in the case of 2nd and 3rd XVs on something of an ad-hoc basis (there having been a number of splits from The Scottish 2nd XV League in recent years). Note that the larger universities run their first teams in both the Scottish Championship, and in the university leagues.

See University Leagues in Scotland and 2nd XV Leagues in Scotland for further details.
