= Mansfield Park, Hawick =

Rugby union ground in Hawick, Scotland

Coordinates: 55°25′56″N 2°45′59″W

Mansfield Park is a rugby union ground in Hawick, Scotland, with a capacity of approximately 5,000.

It is the home of Hawick Rugby Football Club, who currently play in the Scottish Premiership and Border League. It became the home ground of Hawick Football Club in 1888, with the club relocating to Mansfield Park two years after being admitted into the Scottish Football Union in 1886.

The grandstand at Mansfield Park holds 1,400 spectators and is the biggest rugby club stand in the Borders.

In the early days of Hawick Rugby Club, crowds of four or six thousand were common, and ten thousand would come to watch overseas touring teams. In recent years two thousand or more might attend on three or four games each season, including the sevens in April. Facing the grandstand is a steep natural banking, south facing, which attracts many spectators on a sunny sports day. The club rooms have modern bar facilities and a function hall. The Pringle Lounge holds many of the club trophies.
