= Whitecraigs RFC =

Scottish rugby union club, based in Newton Mearns

Coordinates: 55.778998°N 4.35830°W

Whitecraigs
- Full name: Whitecraigs Rugby Football Club
- Union: Scottish Rugby Union
- Founded: 1928; 97 years ago
- Location: Newton Mearns, Scotland
- Ground: West Lodge
- President: Neil Dunning
- Coach: Alex "Mr Bump" Edmonstone
- Captain(s): Lewis Ramage and Connor Duncan
- League: Scottish National League Division Four
- 2024–25: Scottish National League Division Four, 6th of 9
Team kit

Official website
- whitecraigs.org

Whitecraigs Rugby Football Club is a rugby union club based in Newton Mearns, East Renfrewshire, Scotland. The team competes in Scottish National League Division Two, the third tier of Scottish club rugby.

Whitecraigs formerly played its rugby in Deaconsbank

== Honours ==
- Dumbarton Sevens
  - Champions: (2) 1985, 1995

== Notable players ==
These players played at a professional level.

- Jon Welsh - Glasgow Warriors, Newcastle Falcons and Scotland
- Ed Kalman - Border Reivers, Glasgow Warriors and Scotland
- Steve Swindall - Glasgow Warriors, Rotherham Titans and Scotland 'A'
- John Shaw - Glasgow Warriors and Scotland A
- (Scotland) Ryan Moffat - Glasgow Warriors

These players are now coaches:

- (Scotland) Kenny Murray - Glasgow Warriors Asst. Coach
