= Lasswade RFC =

Scottish rugby union club, based in Bonnyrigg

- Full name: Lasswade Rugby Football Club
- Nickname: Swade
- Founded: 1921; 105 years ago
- Location: Bonnyrigg, Scotland
- Ground: Hawthornden
- President: Markie Billingham
- Coach: Dale Robertson
- Captain: Lucas Orsi
- League: Scottish National League Division Three
- 2025–26: Scottish National League Division Three, 8th of 10
1st kit	2nd kit

Official website
- www.pitchero.com/clubs/lasswade

Lasswade Rugby Football Club is a rugby union club based in Bonnyrigg, Midlothian, Scotland. Established in 1921, the club plays at Hawthornden in Lasswade parish and competes in Scottish National League Division Three.

== History ==
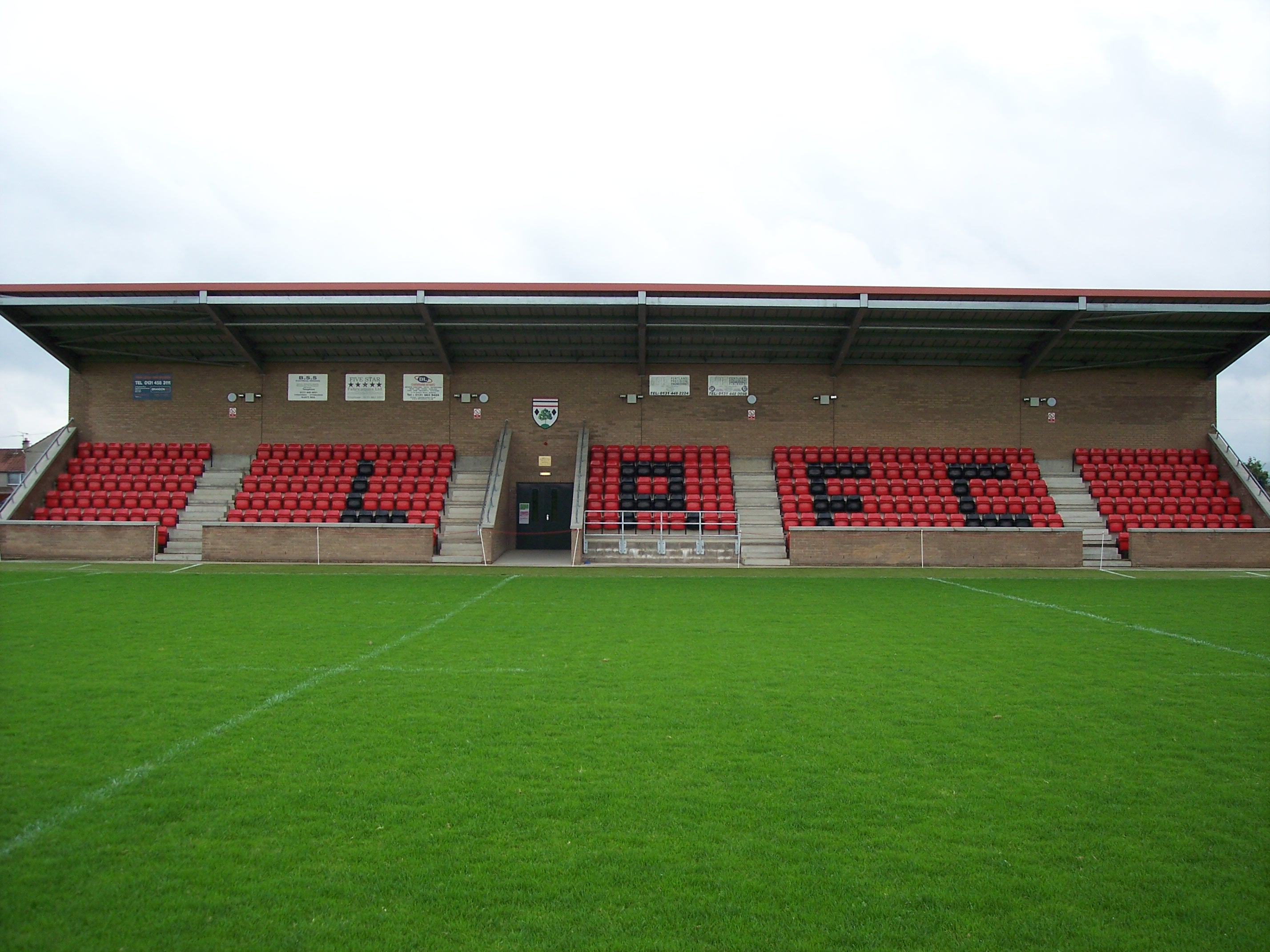
LRFC stand

In 2003 the club sold one of its three pitches to the Local Authority, Midlothian, to fund the improvement of the existing facilities. The money has been ploughed into development with two international size floodlit pitches complemented by a 350-seater grandstand. The new facilities have been used by South Africa, France, New Zealand, Edinburgh Rugby, the Scotland 7s squad and the Scottish Women's Rugby Squad as a training ground. It has also been host to several champagne ties including Scotland under-19s v Italy under19s and a number of Scotland Women's Six Nations matches.

After several consecutive seasons earning promotion, Lasswade 1st XV competed the 2010–11 season in the Scottish National League Division One and were promoted to the Scottish Premiership Division 3 for the 2011–12 season.

Notable former players include the ex-Scotland national rugby union team and British and Irish Lions prop forward Peter Wright.

Lasswade won the final of the SHE National Shield which was held at Murrayfield on Saturday 24 April 2010, beating Greenock Wanderers 17–7. In the same season they also won promotion to National League One (fourth tier) after finishing runners-up in League Two.

In season 2010–11 Lasswade won promotion to Premiership Division Three, the highest league position in their history, by winning National League 1. The club also retained the Shield beating Hawick YM in the final 22–17.

Following more league reconstruction by the SRU, in season 2012–13 Lasswade played in Championship League B. This is essentially the East league of the third tier of domestic rugby. Following further league reconstruction, Lasswade found themselves competing in the National League 3 in season 2014–15.

In March 2015, Lasswade won the National League Division Three title but were relegated following just one season in the third tier. However, after finishing runners-up they immediately bounced back up to National League Division Two in 2017.

== Lasswade Sevens ==
The club run the Lasswade Sevens tournament.

== Honours ==
- Lasswade Sevens
  - Champions (1): 2014
- Scottish National League Division Three
  - Champions (3): 2010–11, 2014–15, 2021–22
  - Runners-Up (1): 2016–17
- Scottish League Championship, sixth-tier
  - Champions (1): 2008–09
- Scottish Rugby Shield
  - Champions: (2) 2009–10, 2010–11
- East Regional League Division One
  - Champions: (1) 2007
- Walkerburn Sevens
  - Champions (1): 2012

== Notable players ==
- Peter Wright
- Jack Mann
