= Howe of Fife RFC =

Scottish rugby union club, based in Cupar

(Scotland) Howe of Fife RFC
- Full name: Howe of Fife Rugby Football Club
- Union: Scottish Rugby Union
- Nickname(s): Howe, The Howe, Howe o Fife, Quins, Harlequins
- Emblem(s): Knight in black armour on horse
- Founded: 1st XV – 1921; 104 years ago, Quins – 2014
- Location: Cupar, Scotland
- Region: Fife/Caledonia
- Ground(s): Duffus Park (Capacity: 280)
- President: Gordon Douglas
- Coach(es): 1st XV – Stewart Lathangie; Quins – Jack Sinclair
- Captain(s): 1st XV – Fraser Allan, Quins – Emma Wood
- League(s): Men: Scottish National League Division Two; Women: Scottish Womens National One
- 2024–25: Men: Scottish National League Division Three, 1st of 9(promoted); Women: Scottish Womens National One, 4th of 6 Home Strip Away Strip

Official website
- www.howerugby.co.uk

Howe of Fife RFC is a rugby union club based in Cupar, Fife, Scotland. It was founded in 1921, and they play in blue and white hoops. The men's first XV team currently competes in Scottish National League Division Two, the women's XV - known as Howe Harlequins - plays in Scottish Womens National One.

== History ==
Previously, the club had two undefeated seasons in 2007 and 2008, earning them rights to promotion. Stewart Lathangie currently coaches the 1st XV. The captain is Fraser Allan. The Howe runs teams from Primary 3 level up to under-18 Colts level. Many players have gone on to represent Fife, Caledonia, and Scotland at age grade level, with a handful going on to represent professional clubs. In 2007, current first XV Captain Chris Mason led the under-18 Howe of Fife squad to a unique treble, winning both the school (as Bell Baxter High School) and the Club Scottish cups as well as the Scottish schools' sevens cup. A number of the players involved in that team now play for the senior side.

Howe Harlequins are the 1st XV Women's team, founded in 2014. The Duffus Park-based club have barely been in existence a few years but have been making massive strides in the women's game. In 2017, they won the BT National Division 2 Championship which promoted them into National 1. With the recent changes to the women's league names, they now start the 2018 season in the Tennent's Women's National League 1. The Harlequins originally got together as a way for women to keep fit through rugby. But with a competitive spirit growing, added to a developing skillset, the side started to play matches against other teams. Since then, the Harlequins haven't looked back. President Murdo Fraser paid tribute to the side after their title win. "Our women's team have shown that anything is possible and we are all very proud of the team and what they have achieved", he said at the time.

In 2017 and 2018, the club was associated with the commemorations of the Battles of the Somme and Arras, including the Eric Milroy commemorative tournament. These Franco-Scottish events gave birth in February 2018 to the creation of the Auld Alliance Trophy, played every year as part of the six nations tournament.

=== Suspensions ===
In November 2017 several of the club's 1st XV men's team received 347 total weeks of suspension for incidents that took place the previous year in which a new player was sexually assaulted by having a bottle inserted into their anus after a match.

== Howe of Fife Sevens ==
The club run the Howe of Fife Sevens tournament.

== Honours ==
=== Men ===
- Howe of Fife Sevens
  - Champions: 1975, 1977, 1986, 1990, 2013, 2014, 2016, 2017
- Stirling Sevens
  - Champions: 1956, 1958, 1987, 2012
- Highland Sevens
  - Champions: 1957
- Clarkston Sevens
  - Champions: 1963
- Waid Academy F.P. Sevens
  - Champions: 1957, 1958, 1960, 1968, 1974, 1975, 1977, 1996
- Moray Sevens
  - Champions: 1959, 1987
- Haddington Sevens
  - Champions: 2017
- Midlands District Sevens
  - Champions: 1949, 1957, 1959, 1983, 1987
- Perthshire Sevens
  - Champions: 2015
- Kirkcaldy Sevens
  - Champions: 1950, 1956, 1957, 1982
- Hamilton Sevens
  - Champions: 2013, 2014, 2015
- Scottish National League Division Two
  - Champions (1): 2011–12
  - Runners-up (3): 2012–13, 2013–14, 2014–15
- Scottish National League Division Three
  - Champions (1): 2009–10

=== Women ===
- Dundee City Sevens
  - Champions (2): 2021, 2022

== Notable players and personnel ==
- David Rollo, 40 caps for Scotland, British and Irish Lions
- Cameron Glasgow/Cammy Glasgow
- Gordon Hamilton Ireland flanker, scored against Australia in 1991 Rugby World Cup
- Tom Pearson, president of the Scottish Rugby Union, 1988–1989
- David Whyte, 13 caps for Scotland, played for Howe during his youth.
- Charlie Drummond, Scotland cap, president of the SRU 1974–1975.
- Dougie McMahon, international referee 1960–1969
- John Howard Wilson, capped for Scotland in 1953.
- Ian Kirkhope
- HL Stewart, played cricket for Scotland.
- Bob Steven, Scotland
- Peter Horne, Glasgow Warriors capped for Scotland in 2013
- Chris Fusaro, Glasgow Warriors capped for Scotland in 2014
- Fergus Thomson, Glasgow Warriors capped for Scotland A and Scotland
- Michael Fedo, Scotland sevens international
- George Horne, Glasgow Warriors, Scotland sevens international and Scotland
- Jamie Ritchie, Edinburgh Rugby and Scotland
- Cameron Fenton, Glasgow Warriors and Edinburgh Rugby
- Matt Fagerson, Glasgow Warriors and Scotland
