= Marr RFC =

Scottish rugby union club, based in Troon

Coordinates: 55.5358°N 4.6236°W

(Scotland) Marr
- Full name: Marr Rugby Football Club
- Union: Scottish Rugby Union
- Location: Troon, Scotland
- Ground: Fullarton Park
- Director of Rugby: Kevin Quinn
- Captain: Colin Sturgeon
- League(s): Men: Scottish National League Division One; Women: Scottish Womens West Two
- 2024–25: Men: Scottish Premiership, 10th of 12 (relegated); Women: Scottish Womens West Three, 1st of 7 (promoted)
Team kit

Official website
- www.marrrugby.com

Marr RFC is a rugby union team based in Troon, Ayrshire, Scotland. The men's side play in the Scottish National League Division One. The women's side play in the Scottish Womens West Two.

== History ==
Marr play their home games at Fullarton estate and has done since early 1970s. Until then it had used the school grounds since the club's formation in the 1940s. It was originally for the former pupils of Marr College, a secondary school in Troon, and there is still a close affiliation between the club and local high school. They play in the distinct colours of purple, gold and green. Over the last few years Marr has had a revival mainly due to the introduction of former Scotland 'A' cap Craig Redpath as head coach and latterly Former Ayr players Paul Burke and Stephen Adair as additional coaches.

Starting with the 2010–11 season, Marr began a run of four successive league title wins which promoted the club from the sixth to the second tier of Scottish club rugby for the 2014–15 season. They were promoted in the 2016–17 season and for the 2017–18 season they will play in the Scottish Premiership.

The side topped the Scottish Premiership in season 2019–20, but the SRU declared the season null and void as it ended prematurely when the coronavirus pandemic broke out.

== Sides ==
- Marr Rugby 1st XV Scottish National League Division One
- Women's 1st XV Scottish Womens West Two
- Marr Rugby 2nd XV (Arnold Clark Inter City Reserve League (Men's))
- Marr Rugby 3rd XV (Arnold Clark West Region Reserve League Division 1 (Men's))
- School Teams (INSPIRESPORT BOY’S U18 (1ST XV) WEST A SCHOOLS CONFERENCE)

== Honours ==
=== Men ===
- Glasgow City Sevens
  - Champions (1): 2018
- Drumpellier Sevens
  - Champions: 1974
- Stirling Sevens
  - Champions: 1973
- Greenock Sevens
  - Champions: 2017
- Tennents National Division 1
  - Champions: 2016–17, 2018–19
- Ardrossan Sevens
  - Champions: 1982
- Musselburgh Sevens
  - Champions: 2022
- Hamilton Sevens
  - Champions: 2022

=== Women ===
- West League Three
  - Champions (1): 2025

== Notable former players ==
- Gordon Brown, 30 caps for Scotland, and 8 for the British and Irish Lions
- Gordon Reid, 41 caps for Scotland
- Darcy Rae, Glasgow Warriors and Scotland
- Peter Brown, former captain of Scotland
- Bill Cuthbertson, Scottish international
