= Currie RFC =

Scottish rugby union club, based in Edinburgh

(Scotland) Currie Chieftains
- Full name: Currie Rugby Football Club
- Union: Scottish Rugby Union
- Nickname: Chieftains
- Founded: 1970; 56 years ago
- Location: Edinburgh, Scotland
- Ground(s): Malleny Park, Balerno, Edinburgh (Capacity: 2,000)
- President: Charles Mullins
- Coach: Mark Cairns
- Captain(s): Rhys Davies, Charlie Brett
- League: Scottish Premiership
- 2025–26: Scottish Premiership, 2nd of 10
Team kit

Official website
- curriechieftains.org

Currie Rugby Football Club are an Edinburgh-based rugby union club in the Scottish Rugby Union, they currently play in the Scottish Premiership. Despite the name, "Currie" RFC is actually based in the neighbouring suburb of Balerno, and they play at Malleny Park.

Currently the club run three senior sides, along with the Colts and youth rugby ages group teams.

== History ==
The foundation of the club was initially started by six individuals; Bob Kirkwood, Jack Hogg, Roger Mclaren, Tom Chandler, David Bisset & Alex Galbraith. Having discussed the formation of a team in a local bar called the Weavers Knowe. From these discussions followed the idea to form a full rugby club in the local area.

The 'six' were joined by Gordon Stewart, and given the necessary backing and, more importantly, use of the facilities at Currie High School, by the Headmaster, Ronnie Paul. Together the group sent out posters and leaflets around the Currie, Balerno and Juniper Green area calling on all interested to attend an open meeting at Curriehill School in April 1970 to 'discuss the formation of a local Rugby Club'. On the given evening 35 individuals attended and it was agreed to form a club to be called Currie Rugby Football Club, with the aim of promoting and developing the game of rugby within the area for the benefit of the sport and the community. The club officially formed in April 1970 and in October that year a team was fielded to play Gala Wanderers at Gala. For the very first game the club played in jerseys borrowed from Boroughmuir. By January 1971 they were fielding two XVs and the following season a third occasionally appeared.

In the season 1973–74 the SRU decided to formalise the then unofficial championship and bring in a league structure, which gave Currie the entry to Edinburgh District League, Division II. Progress and promotion followed in 1976–77. The club was promoted from the District League into the National League during the 1979–80 season, where the club would go undefeated and scored over 1,000 points.

Successive promotion to Division 6 came the next year and following league reconstruction the club was in Division 5 by the start of the 1981–82 season. The rise of the club would continue with them winning promotion in 1982–83, 1985–86 and 1986–87 to arrive in Division 2 of the National League.

In 1989–90 Currie completed a remarkable rise through the leagues by finishing second in Division 2 and were promoted to Division 1 alongside Edinburgh Wanders. The club remained in the top division of Scottish Rugby until 1995 where league reconstruction saw them along with five other teams demoted into the Division 2. However, the club would bounce back the following year to win Division 2 outright regained promotion back to Division I, alongside Jed-Forest. The club have remained in the top tier of the National League ever since.

In 2006–07 season Currie secured their first Division 1 championship with victory over Heriots at Goldenacre, beating Glasgow Hawks to the league title. It completed the fastest ever journey from club formation to League success in the history of Scottish Rugby. They would repeat this in 2009–10 beating Ayr to the title.

In 2017, they rebranded as the Currie Chieftains.

The Post COVID-19 seasons of 2021/22 and 2022/23 were very bittersweet for the club. Maintaining the majority of players from pre-pandemic and even having a squad big enough to enter a 3XV into the reserve leagues of Scottish rugby. Currie reached the final of the Premiership (originally known as Division 1) in both seasons, but lost both finals. The first was a 25-36 loss to Marr at home, in a game that they were favourites to win. The second final was even more cruel on the men in Black and Gold. After scoring a late try through winger Kody McGovern, the Chieftains were up 18-14 away from home against a 13 man Hawick side and only had 6 minutes left of the game to play. However, Hawick scored at the death and converted to win the game 21-18.

In the 2023/24 season, Currie Chieftains reached a third successive Premiership Final and this time, they won it! Once again, playing against Hawick away at Mansfield Park, Currie put in a strong performance. Leading 16-10 at Half Time and winning 26-24, despite playing the entire second half with 14 men. This was the club's third league title and it also won them the Bill McLaren shield.

== Sevens ==
The club run the Currie Sevens tournament. The teams play for the Balerno Bowl.

== Honours ==
- Scottish Premiership
  - Champions (3): 2006–07, 2009–10, 2023–24
- Currie Sevens
  - Champions (3): 1987, 1988, 2024
- Scottish Cup
  - Runners-Up: (2) 2005-06, 2025-26
- Division 2
  - Champions (1): 1995–96
- Division 3
  - Champions (1): 1986–87
- Division 4
  - Champions (1): 1985–86
- Division 7
  - Champions (1): 1980–81
- E.D.U. Division 1
  - Champions (1): 1979–80
- E.D.U. Division 2
  - Champions (1): 1976–77
- Tennents Shield
  - Champions (1): 1996
- Glasgow City Sevens
  - Champions (1): 2001
- Peebles Sevens
  - Champions (1): 1991
- Walkerburn Sevens
  - Champions (3): 1991, 1994, 1995
- Lochaber Sevens
  - Champions (1): 1985
- Forrester Sevens
  - Champions (1): 1981
- Holy Cross Sevens
  - Champions (1): 1986
- Edinburgh Northern Sevens
  - Champions (6): 1979, 1982, 2014, 2016, 2022, 2023
- Edinburgh District Sevens
  - Champions (1): 1982

== Notable former players ==
- Dougie Fife
- Matt Scott
- Ben Cairns
- Peter Loane
- Dave Cherry
- Luke Crosbie
- Adam Hastings
- Graham Ellis
- Richie Vernon
- Ally Donaldson
- Fraser Murray
- Blair Kinghorn
- Ollie Blyth-Lafferty
