= Murrayfield Wanderers FC =

Scottish rugby union club, based in Edinburgh

Murrayfield Wanderers
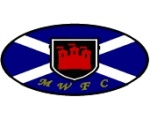
- Murrayfield Wanderers FC Club Badge
- Full name: Murrayfield Wanderers Football Club
- Founded: 1997; 28 years ago
- Location: Edinburgh, Scotland
- Ground(s): Roseburn Park
- President: Chaz Campbell
- Coach(es): 1st XV: Derek O’Riordan; Assistants: Alastair Chalmers & Calum Gauld
- League(s): East Division 1
- 2024–25: East Division 1, 5th of 8
Team kit	2nd kit

Official website
- www.pitchero.com/clubs/murrayfieldwanderersfootballclub

Murrayfield Wanderers Football Club is a rugby union side based in Edinburgh, Scotland, founded by the merger of Edinburgh Wanderers and Murrayfield RFC in 1997.

== Beginnings ==
The club's roots were based on two clubs; Edinburgh Wanderers and Murrayfield RFC. Edinburgh Wanderers was the elder of the two clubs.

For the history of these clubs see:

Edinburgh Wanderers FC dated from 1868. Murrayfield RFC dates from 1971. A merger was proposed, and to facilitate this the Wanderers renamed in 1997, to allow the Murrayfield club to join in a merger.

As part of the merger there was notable restructuring. The Scotman newspaper reporting: "after Murrayfield RFC and Edinburgh Wanderers FC merged in 1997, the old clubhouse on Corstorphine Road was sold and the £300,000 proceeds invested in the new pavilion next to the main stadium. Public sports grants of £125,000 and £165,000 were made on the basis of a wider public benefit."

Both clubs brought together a long history of rugby excellence which can trace its roots back to 1868 when the Edinburgh Wanderers Football Club was formed. Murrayfield RFC itself was borne of a prior merger when Kenmore RFC, Bruntsfield RFC and County Rovers RFC merged to form that club. Kenmore RFC dated from 1916, Bruntsfield even earlier, a 2nd XV extant in 1907, County Rovers extant after the Second World War.

The club celebrated its 150th anniversary in 2018, on the basis of Edinburgh Wanderers history, the earliest of its merged component sides.

The team currently compete in East Division 1 and play their matches in Roseburn Park, Edinburgh.

== Current Form ==
Murrayfield Wanderers finished in 10th place at the end of season 2010–11 but had a much more successful 2012–13, finishing in 4th place. The club currently have three men's teams playing on Saturday, a social team (Pirates).

They won promotion to National League 3 in the 2016/17 season and won the BT Edinburgh Shield, beating Linlithgow 66–10. They competed for the BT Men's Shield Final against Carrick on 22 April, losing 48–21. They also boasted one of the most successful women's team in Scotland, now defunct.

== Honours ==
- Scottish Rugby Shield
  - Winners (1): 2004-05
  - Runners-Up (1): 2016-17
- Penicuik Sevens
  - Winners (1): 2024
- Musselburgh Sevens
  - Winners (1): 2024
- Linlithgow Sevens
  - Winners (1): 2024
