= Peebles RFC =

Scottish rugby union club, based in Peebles

Peebles
- Full name: Peebles Rugby Football Club
- Founded: 1923
- Ground: The Gytes
- President: Mark Clancy
- League: Scottish National League Division Two
- 2025–26: Scottish National League Division One, 9th of 10
Team kit	2nd kit

Official website
- www.peeblesrfc.org

Peebles Rugby Football Club is a rugby union club based in Peebles in the Scottish Borders. The team currently competes in Scottish National League Division Two, the third tier of Scottish club rugby.

The earliest record available of rugby being played in Peebles was of a game in 1877 in Kingsmeadows Park and Peebles Rugby Football Club was formed in 1879. The club ceased to exist about 1900 but was re-constituted in 1923 and now play their home games at the Gytes.

Peebles is outwith the central Borders and was outside the main rugby playing towns of Galashiels, Melrose, Selkirk and Hawick. They often lacked players, with a stronger football presence to the north, due to the links to Midlothian and Edinburgh. With the growth of neighbouring Innerleithen, improving links and players from local schools, PRFC gradually climbed the ranks.

In 1974–75 Peebles joined the National Leagues and were placed in Division 5 East. Promotion to Division 3 came in 1989–90. The big jump came in 2001–02 to Division 2 and then to Division 1 in 2002–03. After two seasons in Division 1, there followed two successive drops to Premier 3 before gaining promotion back to Scottish Hydro Electric Premier 2 in 2007–08 where Peebles remained until restructuring of the League system in 2011.

== Honours ==
- Scottish League Championship, second-tier
  - Champions (1): 2001–02
- Scottish League Championship, third-tier
  - Champions (4): 1990–91, 1999–00, 2012–13, 2023–24
- Scottish Rugby Shield
  - Runners-Up (1): 2008–09
- Peebles Sevens
  - Champions (4): 1992, 2001, 2002, 2011
- Walkerburn Sevens
  - Champions (4): 1992, 1996, 2014, 2022

== See also ==
- Border League
- Borders Sevens Circuit
