= Gala RFC =

Scottish rugby union club, based in Galashiels

(Scotland) Gala Rugby
- Full name: Gala Rugby Football Club
- Union: SRU
- Nickname: The Maroons
- Founded: 1875; 151 years ago
- Region: Scottish Borders
- Ground: Netherdale (Capacity: 4,000)
- President: Sinclair Paterson
- Director of Rugby: Lewis Bertram
- Coach(es): Ewen Robbie; Ross Ford; Lewis Bertram; Craig Dods
- Captain: Craig Keddie
- League: Scottish National League Division One
- 2025–26: Scottish National League Division One, 7th of 10
Team kit

Official website
- www.galarfc.com

Gala Rugby Football Club is a rugby union team based in Galashiels in the Scottish Borders. Founded in 1875, it plays its home games at Netherdale. The team currently competes in Scottish National League Division One, the second tier of Scottish club rugby, and the Border League (the oldest established rugby union league in the world).

== Early history ==
The club was formed at a time of change in Galashiels, and the Borders in general, with the increasingly industrial textile industry. Cricket was played by the new influx of workers (particularly Yorkshire) and a winter alternate was needed, so a 'Football club' was formed in 1876. Although named a 'football' club they only ever played rugby union football and never association football. Rugby Union Football is now generally referred to as rugby, but at the time it was still commonly regarded as a code of football, as it technically still is.

In 1883, the club took part in the first ever Sevens tournament in Melrose and competed in the final with the hosts. Within a year they (and many other Border clubs) had started their own Sevens, also known as 'Sports'. In 1994, these separate tournaments were organized into the Borders Sevens Circuit league structure, the winners are crowned as the "Kings of the Sevens". Gala has been 'the Kings' on two occasions, in 2004 and the first ever winners in 1994.

In 1912 the club moved from Mossilee to a new ground at Netherdale, the new pavilion and grandstand built at a cost of 1150. 1931–32 saw Gala's first and only success in the Scottish Unofficial Championship under the Captaincy of Jimmy Ferguson.

From 1979, with Scottish internationalists Derek White and Peter Dods in the team, Gala won the Division 1 title three consecutive seasons.

== 1995–present ==
In 1995, Gala was one of eight teams to play in the new Scottish Premier League. In 1999, inspired by a young Chris Patterson at Stand-off, Gala won a treble of medals, the Division 2 title, the Scottish Cup, and Melrose Sevens. The lowest point in modern history came in 2007, when Gala was relegated to Division 3 for the first time in its history. Worse was that it was only points difference of 2 over the whole season. This gave the club the chance to clear out the dead wood and the team bounced back into Division 2 at the first time of asking.

The 2010–11 season saw promotion back into the top flight, its first full season back. 2011–12, saw a 3rd-place finish and the Scottish cup for the second time. Gala finished 2012–13 as both Premier Division and Scottish cup runners-up. 2013–14 saw Gala finish runners-up in the Premiership again. This was a painful result as they were leading for much of the season only to lose out on the final match of the season to local rivals Melrose. They also reached the semi-finals of the Scottish cup and won the Border League.

In February 2017 the club launched a rugby academy, despite the realisation that they would be relegated from the premiership at the end of the season.

== Honours ==
- Scottish Premiership
  - Champions (3): 1979–80, 1980–81, 1982-83
  - Runners-up (8): 1974-75, 1975-76, 1976-77, 1978-79, 1983-84, 1993-94, 2012-13, 2013-14
- Scottish League Championship, second-tier
  - Champions (2): 1998–99, 2003-04
- Scottish League Championship, third-tier
  - Champions (1): 2007-08
- Scottish Cup
  - Winners (2): 1998–99, 2011-12
- Gala Sevens
  - Champions (27): 1884, 1887, 1888, 1890, 1891, 1907, 1908, 1913, 1914, 1920, 1922, 1929, 1930, 1934, 1954, 1963, 1969, 1970, 1971, 1972, 1977, 1982, 1993, 1994, 1995, 2013, 2015
- Langholm Sevens
  - Champions (10): 1908, 1910, 1924, 1964, 1967, 1969, 1970, 1972, 1993, 1998
- Melrose Sevens
  - Champions (15): 1884, 1890, 1891, 1903, 1932, 1937, 1959, 1964, 1970, 1971, 1972, 1977, 1981, 1994, 1999
- Hawick Sevens
  - Champions (16): 1891, 1893, 1901, 1907, 1919, 1923, 1931, 1940, 1949, 1956, 1967, 1972, 1982, 1995, 1996, 2017
- Berwick Sevens
  - Champions (3): 2004, 2014, 2015
- Peebles Sevens
  - Champions (5): 1924, 1954, 1957, 1961, 2015
- Kelso Sevens
  - Champions (15): 1920, 1922, 1924, 1931, 1934, 1938, 1956, 1961, 1964, 1970, 1971, 1972, 1975, 1976, 2003
- Earlston Sevens
  - Champions (18): 1923, 1927, 1928, 1930, 1938, 1952, 1959, 1960, 1964, 1968, 1971, 1988, 1989, 1991, 1993, 2000, 2004, 2017
- Selkirk Sevens
  - Champions (11): 1921, 1925, 1950, 1952, 1962, 1963, 1964, 1968, 1970, 1971, 1992
- Kings of the Sevens
  - Champions (4): 1994, 1995, 2004, 2015
- Walkerburn Sevens
  - Champions (3): 1924, 1926, 1938
- Portobello Sevens
  - Champions (2): 1981, 1985
- Gala Thistle Sevens
  - Champions (1): 1888
- St. Boswells Sevens
  - Champions (1): 1978
- Ardrossan Sevens
  - Champions (1): 1970
- Edinburgh Borderers Sevens
  - Champions (1): 1923
- Preston Lodge Sevens
  - Champions (1): 1985
- Penicuik Sevens
  - Champions (3): 1975, 1977, 1983
- South of Scotland District Sevens
  - Champions (1): 1974
- Stirling Sevens
  - Champions (2): 1992, 1996
- Currie Sevens
  - Champions (2): 1994, 1997

== Notable players ==
=== British and Irish Lions ===
- (Scotland) Gregor Townsend
- (Scotland) Derek White
- (Scotland) Nathan Hines
- (Scotland) Tom Smith
- (Scotland) Peter Dods
- (Scotland) Rory Sutherland

=== Scotland internationalists ===
The following former Gala players have represented Scotland at full international level.

- (Scotland) Jim Aitken
- (Scotland) Arthur Brown
- (Scotland) Peter Brown
- (Scotland) Ian Corcoran
- (Scotland) Geoff Cross
- (Scotland) Bob Cunningham
- (Scotland) Gordon Dickson
- (Scotland) Peter Dods
- (Scotland) Michael Dods
- (Scotland) Tom Elliot
- (Scotland) Tom Elliot
- (Scotland) Jimmy Ferguson
- (Scotland) Jim Ford
- (Scotland) John Fox
- (Scotland) John Frame
- (Scotland) Drew Gill
- (Scotland) Dod Gray
- (Scotland) Nathan Hines
- (Scotland) Kenneth Lawrie
- (Scotland) David Leslie
- (Scotland) Nairn McEwan
- (Scotland) Alex Moore
- (Scotland) Chris Paterson
- (Scotland) Duncan Paterson
- (Scotland) Henry Polson
- (Scotland) Stevie Scott
- (Scotland) Duncan Shaw
- (Scotland) Brian Shillinglaw
- (Scotland) Tom Smith
- (Scotland) Borth Todd
- (Scotland) Gregor Townsend
- (Scotland) Jock Turner
- (Scotland) Derek White
- (Scotland) Bob Wilson
- (Scotland) Doddie Wood

=== Notable non-Scottish players ===
The following is a list of notable non-Scottish international representative former Gala players:

- (Samoa) Opeta Palepoi

=== South players ===
The following former Gala players have represented South at provincial level.

- (Scotland) John Fox
- Angus Dun
- Ben Gill
- Craig Keddie
- Gary Isaac
- Murray Wilson
- Robbie Irvine

=== Notable also outside rugby union ===
The following is a list of notable former Gala players who have achieved notability in fields outwith rugby union:

- P. J. Solomon - rugby league international
- Tom Smith - basketball international
- Andrew Murdison - rugby league player for Halifax

== See also ==
- Galashiels
- Borders Sevens Circuit

Sources

- Bath, Richard (ed.) The Complete Book of Rugby (Seven Oaks Ltd, 1997 ISBN 1-86200-013-1)
- Godwin, Terry Complete Who's Who of International Rugby (Cassell, 1987, ISBN 0-7137-1838-2)
- Jones, J.R. Encyclopedia of Rugby Union Football (Robert Hale, London, 1976 ISBN 0-7091-5394-5)
