= List of Six Nations Championship hat-tricks =

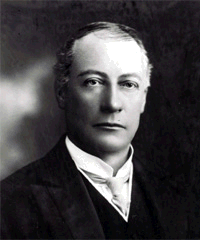
Charles Wade, of England, scored the Championship's first hat-trick.

A hat-trick in rugby union, the scoring of three tries or three drop goals in a single match, has been achieved 55 times in the history of the Six Nations Championship. The annual competition, established in 1882, was originally known as the Home Nations Championship and contested between England, Ireland, Scotland and Wales. It was expanded to the Five Nations when France joined in 1910, (Note: France were ejected from the competition in 1931 over allegations of professionalism, which was not sanctioned at the time. They were re-admitted in 1939.) and then to the Six Nations with the addition of Italy in 2000.

The first player to achieve the feat was Charles Wade, who was an Australian student at Oxford University when he was called up as a travelling reserve for England's match against Wales. When Philip Newton got lost on his way to the match, Wade was instated in his place. He scored three tries in England's 2–0 victory, which was the first match of the championship. At that time, a try by itself was not worth any points but allowed the team to try to kick a goal. George Lindsay scored five tries in Scotland's 4–0 win over Wales in 1887, the most tries scored by a single player in a Championship match.

Besides Lindsay, six players have scored more than three tries in a Championship match; of these Ian Smith is the only player to achieve the feat twice. He scored four tries in successive matches during the 1925 Five Nations Championship. Wales' Jehoida Hodges normally played as a forward, but after an injury to winger Tom Pearson during a match against England, Hodges was moved to the wing. Despite playing out of position, he scored a hat-trick in a 21–5 victory for Wales. As of 2017, the only forwards to score a Championship hat-trick while actually playing in the forwards are Michel Crauste; he scored three tries for France in their 13–0 victory over England in 1962 and CJ Stander; he scored three tries for Ireland in a 63–10 win over Italy in 2017.

Four players have scored a hat-trick of drop goals: Pierre Albaladejo, Jean-Patrick Lescarboura, Diego Dominguez and Neil Jenkins. No Italian has scored a hat-trick of tries in the competition, with Dominguez's hat-trick of drop goals the only one by an Italian player. English players have scored the most hat-tricks with 18, while France, Ireland and Scotland have conceded the most, with 12 each. Three players have scored a hat-trick and been on the losing side; Robert Montgomery in Ireland's 0–1 loss to Wales in 1887, Howard Marshall in England's 11–12 defeat to Wales in 1893, and Émile Ntamack in France's 33–34 loss to Wales in 1999. Lescarboura's hat-trick against England in 1985 and Jenkins' against Scotland in 2001, are the only times the feat has been achieved with the match ending in a draw. The most recent hat-trick was achieved by Huw Jones (Scotland) against Italy on 1 February 2025.

== Hat-tricks ==
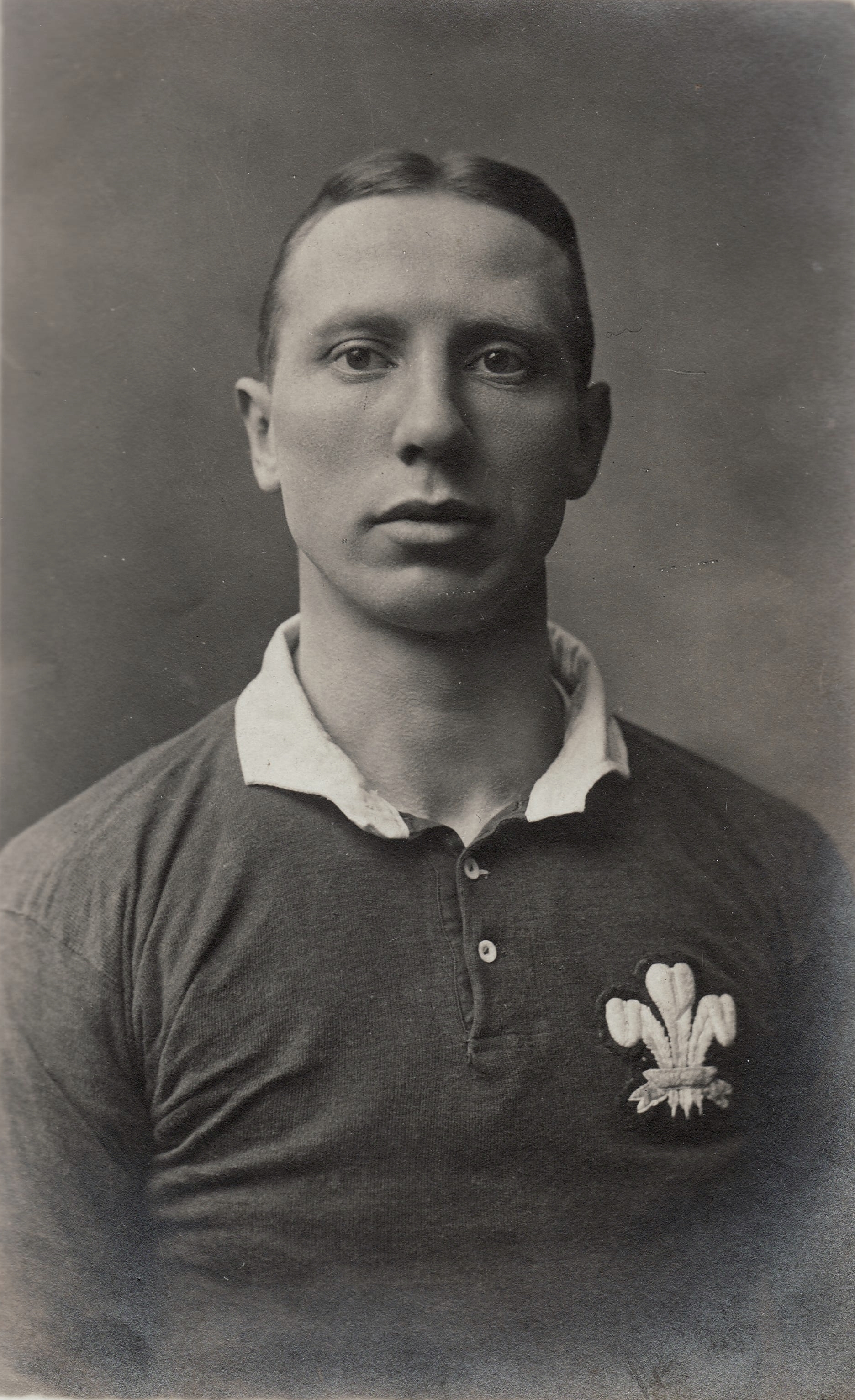
Reggie Gibbs of Wales scored a hat-trick in both the 1910 and 1911 tournaments.

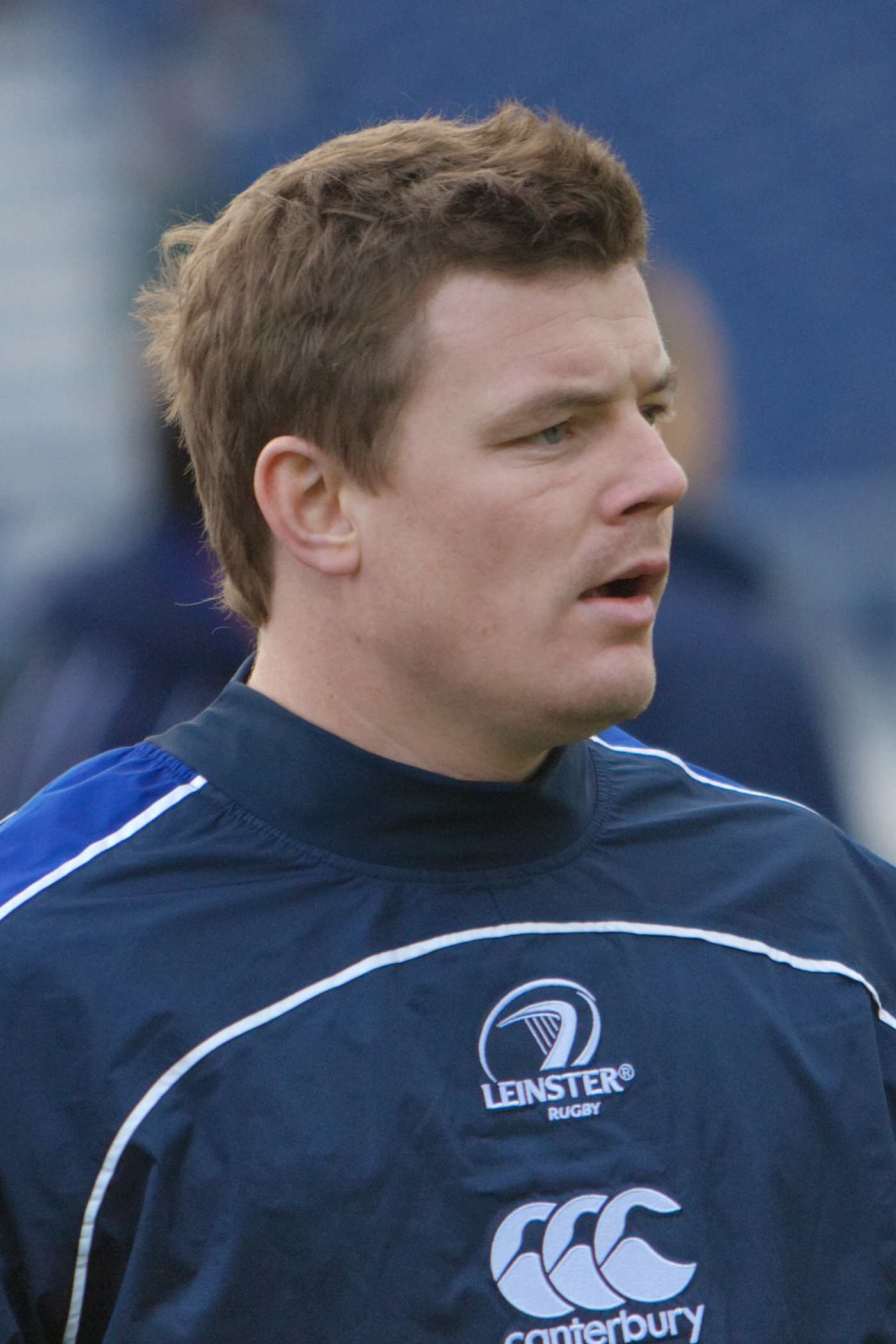
Brian O'Driscoll is the only Irishman to have scored two hat-tricks in the tournament's history.

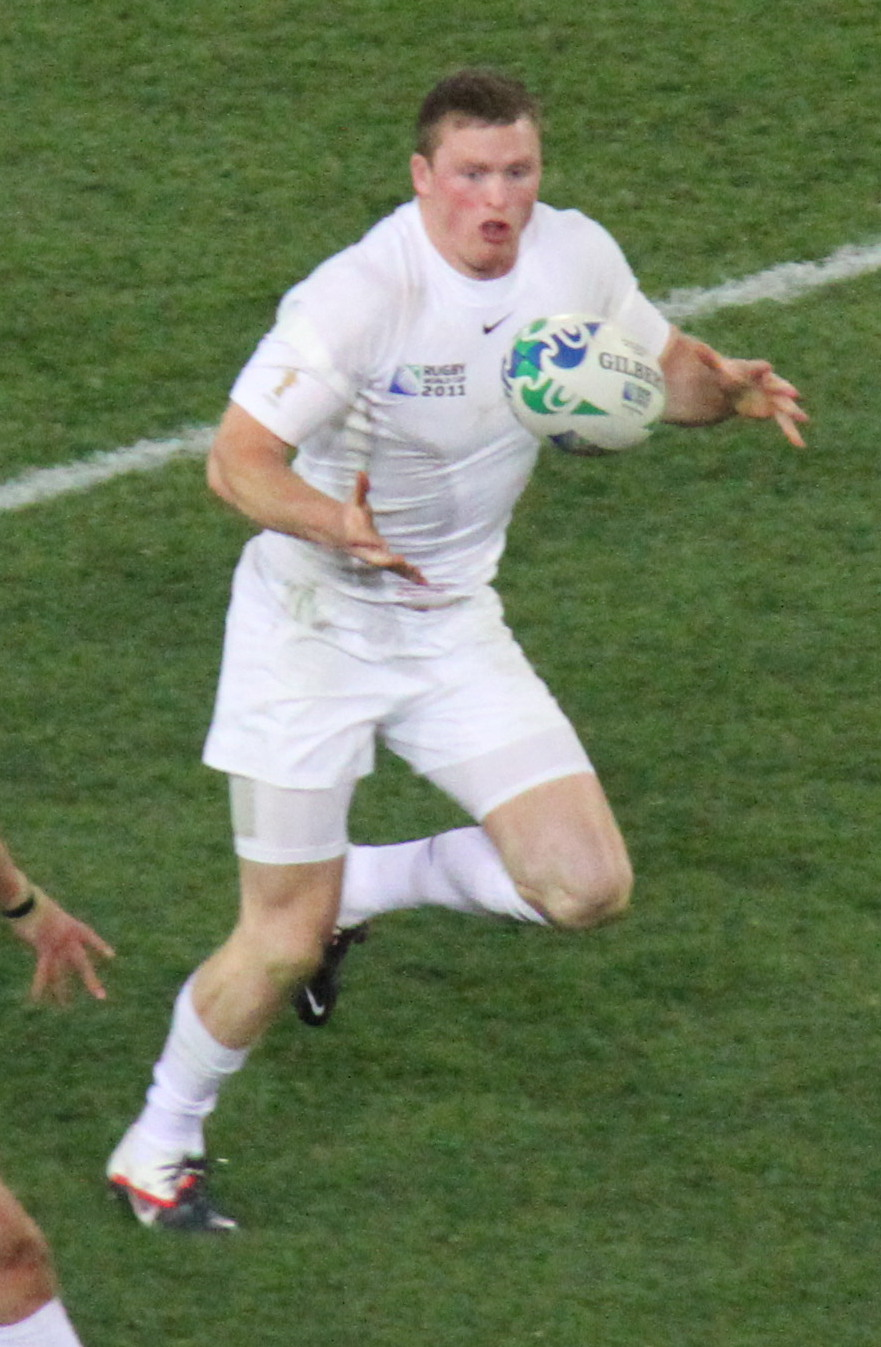
Chris Ashton's four tries in 2011 against Italy is the most by one player in a single Championship match since 1969.

- All statistics are correct as of 25 November 2024.

Key
^{4}	Player scored four tries
^{5}	Player scored five tries

=== Tries ===
Six Nations Championship try hat-tricks
No.	Player	For	Against	Result	Venue	Date
1	Charles Wade	England	Wales	2–0	St. Helen's, Swansea	16 December 1882
2	George Lindsay^{5}	Scotland	Wales	4–0	Raeburn Place, Edinburgh	26 February 1887
3	Robert Montgomery	Ireland	Wales	0–1	Birkenhead Park	12 March 1887
4	William Wotherspoon	Scotland	Ireland	14–0	Ballynafeigh, Belfast	21 February 1891
5	Howard Marshall	England	Wales	11–12	Cardiff Arms Park, Cardiff	7 January 1893
6	Willie Llewellyn^{4}	Wales	England	26–3	St. Helen's, Swansea	7 January 1899
7	Jehoida Hodges	Wales	England	21–5	St. Helen's, Swansea	10 January 1903
8	Johnny Williams	Wales	Ireland	29–0	Cardiff Arms Park, Cardiff	9 March 1907
9	Reggie Gibbs	Wales	France	49–14	St. Helen's, Swansea	1 January 1910
10	James Tennent	Scotland	France	27–0	Inverleith, Edinburgh	22 January 1910
11	Johnny Williams	Wales	Ireland	19–3	Lansdowne Road, Dublin	12 March 1910
12	Reggie Gibbs	Wales	Scotland	32–10	Inverleith, Edinburgh	4 February 1911
13	Bill Stewart	Scotland	France	21–3	Parc des Princes, Paris	1 January 1913
14	Vincent Coates	England	France	20–0	Twickenham, London	25 January 1913
15	Bill Stewart^{4}	Scotland	Ireland	29–14	Inverleith, Edinburgh	22 February 1913
16	Joseph Quinn	Ireland	France	24–0	Mardyke, Cork	24 March 1913
17	Cyril Lowe	England	Scotland	16–15	Inverleith, Edinburgh	21 March 1914
18	Cyril Lowe	England	France	39–13	Stade Olympique de Colombes	13 April 1914
19	Ronald Poulton-Palmer^{4}	England	France	39–13	Stade Olympique de Colombes	13 April 1914
20	Brinley Williams	Wales	Ireland	28–4	Cardiff Arms Park, Cardiff	13 March 1920
21	Ian Smith	Scotland	Wales	35–10	Inverleith, Edinburgh	2 February 1924
22	Jake Jacob	England	France	19–7	Twickenham, London	23 February 1924
23	Ian Smith^{4}	Scotland	France	25–4	Inverleith, Edinburgh	24 January 1925
24	Ian Smith^{4}	Scotland	Wales	24–14	St. Helen's, Swansea	7 February 1925
25	Johnnie Wallace	Scotland	France	20–6	Stade Olympique de Colombes	2 January 1926
26	Eugene Davy	Ireland	Scotland	14–11	Murrayfield, Edinburgh	22 February 1930
27	Seamus Byrne	Ireland	Scotland	26–8	Murrayfield, Edinburgh	28 February 1953
28	Michel Crauste	France	England	13–0	Stade Olympique de Colombes	24 February 1962
29	Christian Darrouy	France	Ireland	24–5	Lansdowne Road, Dublin	26 January 1963
30	Maurice Richards^{4}	Wales	England	30–9	Cardiff Arms Park, Cardiff	12 April 1969
31	John Carleton	England	Scotland	30–18	Murrayfield, Edinburgh	15 March 1980
32	Éric Bonneval	France	Scotland	28–22	Parc des Princes, Paris	7 March 1987
33	Chris Oti	England	Ireland	35–3	Twickenham, London	19 March 1988
34	Iwan Tukalo	Scotland	Ireland	37–21	Murrayfield, Edinburgh	4 March 1989
35	David Venditti	France	Ireland	32–15	Lansdowne Road, Dublin	18 January 1997
36	Émile Ntamack	France	Wales	33–34	Stade de France, Saint-Denis	6 March 1999
37	Austin Healey	England	Italy	59–12	Stadio Flaminio, Rome	18 March 2000
38	Brian O'Driscoll	Ireland	France	27–25	Stade de France, Saint-Denis	19 March 2000
39	Rob Henderson	Ireland	Italy	41–22	Stadio Flaminio, Rome	3 February 2001
40	Will Greenwood	England	Wales	44–15	Millennium Stadium, Cardiff	3 February 2001
41	Brian O'Driscoll	Ireland	Scotland	43–22	Lansdowne Road, Dublin	2 March 2002
42	Jason Robinson	England	Italy	50–9	Stadio Flaminio, Rome	15 February 2004
43	Mark Cueto	England	Italy	39–7	Twickenham, London	12 March 2005
44	Jamie Noon	England	Scotland	43–22	Twickenham, London	19 March 2005
45	Vincent Clerc	France	Ireland	26–21	Stade de France, Saint-Denis	9 February 2008
46	Chris Ashton^{4}	England	Italy	59–13	Twickenham, London	12 February 2011
47	George North	Wales	Italy	61–20	Stadio Olimpico, Rome	21 March 2015
48	Jonathan Joseph	England	Italy	40–9	Stadio Olimpico, Rome	14 February 2016
49	CJ Stander	Ireland	Italy	63–10	Stadio Olimpico, Rome	11 February 2017
50	Craig Gilroy	Ireland	Italy	63–10	Stadio Olimpico, Rome	11 February 2017
51	Jonathan Joseph	England	Scotland	61–21	Twickenham, London	11 March 2017
52	Blair Kinghorn	Scotland	Italy	33–20	Murrayfield, Edinburgh	2 February 2019
53	Jonny May	England	France	44–8	Twickenham, London	10 February 2019
54	Josh Adams	Wales	Italy	42–0	Millennium Stadium, Cardiff	1 February 2020
55	Gabin Villière	France	Italy	37–10	Stade de France, Saint-Denis	6 February 2022
56	Blair Kinghorn	Scotland	Italy	26–14	Murrayfield, Edinburgh	18 March 2023
57	Duhan van der Merwe	Scotland	England	30–21	Murrayfield, Edinburgh	25 February 2024
58	Huw Jones	Scotland	Italy	31–19	Murrayfield, Edinburgh	1 February 2025
59	Henry Arundell	England	Wales	48–7	Twickenham, London	7 February 2026
60	Louis Bielle-Biarrey^{4}	France	England	48–46	Stade de France, Saint-Denis	14 March 2026

=== Multiple hat-tricks ===
Multiple hat-tricks
Player	No.	Years
(Scotland) Ian Smith	3	1924, 1925
(Wales) Johnny Williams	2	1907, 1910
(Wales) Reggie Gibbs	2	1910, 1911
(Scotland) Bill Stewart	2	1913
(England) Cyril Lowe	2	1914
Brian O'Driscoll	2	2000, 2002
(England) Jonathan Joseph	2	2016, 2017
(Scotland) Blair Kinghorn	2	2019, 2023

=== Drop goals ===
Six Nations Championship drop goal hat-tricks
No.	Player	For	Against	Result	Venue	Date
1	Pierre Albaladejo	France	Ireland	23–6	Stade Olympique de Colombes	9 April 1960
2	Jean-Patrick Lescarboura	France	England	9–9	Twickenham, London	2 February 1985
3	Diego Domínguez	Italy	Scotland	34–20	Stadio Flaminio, Rome	5 February 2000
4	Neil Jenkins	Wales	Scotland	28–28	Murrayfield, Edinburgh	17 February 2001

=== Player hat-tricks by their national team ===
Player's hat-tricks by their national team
Team	Tries for	Tries against	Drop goals for	Drop goals against	Total for	Total against
England	19	4	0	1	19	5
Scotland	13	9	0	2	13	11
Wales	10	9	1	0	11	9
Ireland	9	10	0	1	9	11
France	7	12	2	0	9	12
Italy	0	14	1	0	1	15

== See also ==
- List of Rugby World Cup hat-tricks
- List of Six Nations Championship Player of the Championship winners
- List of Six Nations Championship records

== Bibliography ==
- Smith, David; Williams, Gareth (1980). Fields of Praise: The Official History of The Welsh Rugby Union. Cardiff: University of Wales Press. ISBN 0-7083-0766-3.
