= List of Scotland national rugby union team records =

Scotland has played international rugby union since 1871, when they beat England in their first Test match. Scotland have competed in every Rugby World Cup. The records listed below only include performances in Test matches. The top five are listed in each category.

== Team records ==
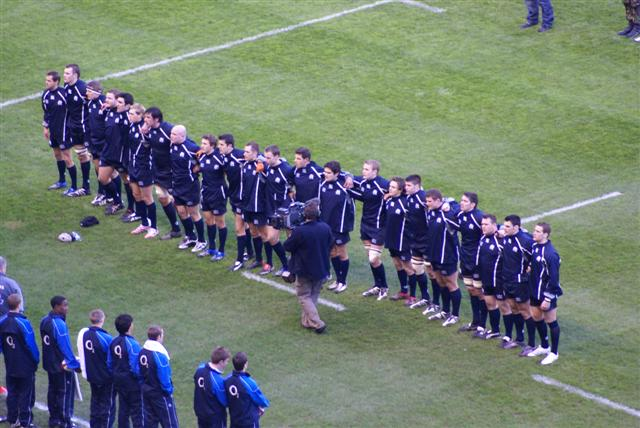
Scotland lines up for the anthem before a game.

Greatest winning margin
Points margin (score)	Opposing team	Venue	Year
92 (100–8)	Japan	McDiarmid Park, Perth	2004
89 (89–0)	Côte d'Ivoire	Olympia Park, Rustenburg	1995
85 (85-0)	USA	Murrayfield Stadium, Edinburgh	2025
84 (84–0)	Romania	Stade Pierre-Mauroy, Lille	2023
62 (67–5)	Japan	Murrayfield Stadium, Edinburgh	2026

Greatest losing margin
Points margin (score)	Opposing team	Venue	Year
58 (10–68)	South Africa	Murrayfield Stadium, Edinburgh	1997
49 (20–69)	New Zealand	Carisbrook, Dunedin	2000
49 (6–55)	South Africa	Nelson Mandela Bay Stadium, Port Elizabeth	2014
48 (3–51)	Wales	Millennium Stadium, Cardiff	2014
46 (3–49)	New Zealand	Murrayfield Stadium, Edinburgh	2010

== Individual records ==
Most appearances
Appearances	Player	Period
110	Ross Ford	2004–2017
109	Chris Paterson	1999–2011
105	Sean Lamont	2004–2016
100	Stuart Hogg	2012-2023
97	Finn Russell	2014–

Most appearances as captain
Appearances	Player	Period
40	Greig Laidlaw	2013–2019
25	David Sole	1989–1992
22	Stuart Hogg	2020-2022
21	Bryan Redpath	1998–2003
20	Gavin Hastings	1993–1995

Most tries
Tries	Player	Period
41	Darcy Graham	2018–
35	Duhan van der Merwe	2020–
27	Stuart Hogg	2012–2023
25	Huw Jones	2016–
24	Ian Smith	1924–1933
24	Tony Stanger	1989–1998

Most points
Points	Player	Period
809	Chris Paterson	1999–2011
714	Greig Laidlaw	2012–2019
667	Gavin Hastings	1986–1995
524	Finn Russell	2014–
269	Andy Irvine	1972–1982

Most points in a match
Points	Player	Opposing team	Venue	Year
44	Gavin Hastings	Côte d'Ivoire	Olympia Park, Rustenburg	1995
40	Chris Paterson	Japan	McDiarmid Park, Perth	2004
33	Gregor Townsend	United States	Murrayfield Stadium, Edinburgh	2000
31	Gavin Hastings	Tonga	Loftus Versfeld Stadium, Pretoria	1995
27	Gavin Hastings	Romania	Carisbrook, Dunedin	1987
27	Ben Healy	Romania	Stade Pierre-Mauroy, Lille	2023

Hat-tricks
Tries	Player	Opposing team	Venue	Year
5	George Lindsay	Wales	Raeburn Place, Edinburgh	1887
4	Bill Stewart	Ireland	Inverleith, Edinburgh	1913
4	Ian Smith	France	Inverleith, Edinburgh	1925
4	Ian Smith	Wales	St. Helen's, Swansea	1925
4	Gavin Hastings	Côte d'Ivoire	Olympia Park, Rustenburg	1995
4	Kyle Steyn	Tonga	Murrayfield Stadium, Edinburgh	2021
4	Darcy Graham	Romania	Stade Pierre-Mauroy, Lille	2023
4	Darcy Graham	Fiji	Murrayfield Stadium, Edinburgh	2024
3	Robert MacKenzie	Ireland	Ormeau Cricket Ground, Belfast	1887
3	William Wotherspoon	Ireland	Ballynafeigh, Belfast	1891
3	James Tennent	France	Inverleith, Edinburgh	1910
3	William Stewart	France	Parc des Princes, Paris	1913
3	Ian Smith	Wales	Inverleith, Edinburgh	1924
3	Johnnie Wallace	France	Stade Olympique Yves-du-Manoir, Colombes	1926
3	John Jeffrey	Romania	Carisbrook, Dunedin	1987
3	Iwan Tukalo	Ireland	Murrayfield Stadium, Edinburgh	1989
3	Tony Stanger	Romania	Murrayfield Stadium, Edinburgh	1989
3	Iwan Tukalo	Zimbabwe	Murrayfield Stadium, Edinburgh	1991
3	Andrew Craig	Fiji	Murrayfield Stadium, Edinburgh	2002
3	Chris Paterson	Japan	McDiarmid Park, Perth	2004
3	Andrew Henderson	Ireland	Murrayfield Stadium, Edinburgh	2007
3	Allister Hogg	Romania	Murrayfield Stadium, Edinburgh	2007
3	George Turner	Canada	Commonwealth Stadium, Edmonton	2018
3	Tommy Seymour	Fiji	Murrayfield Stadium, Edinburgh	2018
3	Blair Kinghorn	Italy	Murrayfield Stadium, Edinburgh	2019
3	George Horne	Russia	Shizuoka Stadium, Fukuroi	2019
3	Darcy Graham	Argentina	Murrayfield Stadium, Edinburgh	2022
3	Blair Kinghorn	Italy	Murrayfield Stadium, Edinburgh	2023
3	Duhan van der Merwe	England	Murrayfield Stadium, Edinburgh	2024
3	Ewan Ashman	United States	Audi Field, Washington DC	2024
3	Huw Jones	Italy	Murrayfield Stadium, Edinburgh	2025
3	Jamie Dobie	United States	Murrayfield Stadium, Edinburgh	2025
3	Darcy Graham	United States	Murrayfield Stadium, Edinburgh	2025
3	Ewan Ashman	New Zealand	Murrayfield Stadium, Edinburgh	2026
3	Darcy Graham	Japan	Murrayfield Stadium, Edinburgh	2026
3	Liam McConnell	Japan	Murrayfield Stadium, Edinburgh	2026
