= List of Six Nations Championship records =

This is a list of individual and team records for the Six Nations Championship and its predecessors the Five Nations and Home Nations Championships.

== Individual ==
=== Appearances ===
The players with the most appearances in the championship are listed. Those still playing at international level appear in bold type. (Updated 15 March 2025)

Player name	Caps	Starts	Nation	Time span
Sergio Parisse	69	69	Italy	2004–2019
Cian Healy	67	44	Ireland	2010–2025
Alun Wyn Jones	67	65	Wales	2007–2023
Brian O'Driscoll	65	65	Ireland	2000–2014
Rory Best	64	55	Ireland	2006–2019
Ronan O’Gara	63	41	Ireland	2000–2013
Conor Murray	62	47	Ireland	2012–2025
Martin Castrogiovanni	60	44	Italy	2003–2016
Johnny Sexton	60	56	Ireland	2010–2023
Mike Gibson	56	56	Ireland	1964–1979
Gethin Jenkins	56	38	Wales	2003–2016
Peter O'Mahony	56	42	Ireland	2012–2025
Dan Cole	55	45	England	2010–2024
Ross Ford	55	42	Scotland	2006–2017
Stuart Hogg	55	54	Scotland	2012–2023
John Hayes	54	54	Ireland	2000–2010
Jason Leonard	54	49	England	1991–2004
Alessandro Zanni	54	45	Italy	2006–2020
**Taulupe Faletau**	53	47	Wales	2012–2025
Leonardo Ghiraldini	53	47	Italy	2007–2019
Willie John McBride	53	53	Ireland	1962–1975
Chris Paterson	53	49	Scotland	2000–2011
Ben Youngs	53	40	England	2010–2023

=== Points ===
The top ten players with the most points in the championship are listed. Those still playing at international level appear in bold type. (Updated 14 March 2026)

No.	Player name	Points	Nation
1	Johnny Sexton	566	Ireland
2	Ronan O'Gara	557	Ireland
3	Jonny Wilkinson	546	England
4	Owen Farrell	528	England
5	Stephen Jones	467	Wales
6	Leigh Halfpenny	424	Wales
7	Neil Jenkins	406	Wales
8	Chris Paterson	403	Scotland
9	**Thomas Ramos**	313	France
10	**Finn Russell**	309	Scotland

=== Tries ===
All players with at least 18 tries in the championship are listed. Those still playing at international level appear in bold type.(Updated 14 March 2026)

No.	Player name	Tries	Nation
1	Brian O'Driscoll	26	Ireland
2	Ian Smith	24	Scotland
3	George North	23	Wales
4	Shane Williams	22	Wales
5	**Louis Bielle-Biarrey**	18	France
5	Gareth Edwards	18	Wales
5	Cyril Lowe	18	England
5	Rory Underwood	18	England

=== Scoring ===
	Match		Season		Career	
Points	**35**	Jonny Wilkinson — England v Italy (2001)	**89**	(England) Jonny Wilkinson — 2001	**566**	(Ireland) Johnny Sexton — 2009–2023
Tries	**5**	George Lindsay — Scotland v Wales (1887)	**9**	(France) **Louis Bielle-Biarrey** — 2026	**26**	(Ireland) Brian O'Driscoll — 2000–2014
Conversions	**9**	Jonny Wilkinson — England v Italy (2001), Paddy Jackson — Ireland v Italy (2017)	**25**	(France) **Thomas Ramos** — 2026	**102**	(Ireland) Johnny Sexton — 2009–2023
Penalties	**7**	Simon Hodgkinson — England v Wales (1991), Rob Andrew — England v Scotland (1995), Jonny Wilkinson — England v France (1999), Neil Jenkins — Wales v Italy (2000), Gérald Merceron — France v Italy (2002), Chris Paterson — Scotland v Wales (2007), Leigh Halfpenny — Wales v Scotland (2013), Maxime Machenaud - France v England (2016)	**19**	(Wales) Leigh Halfpenny — 2013	**109**	(Ireland) Ronan O'Gara — 2000–2013
Drop Goals	**3**	Pierre Albaladejo — France v Ireland (1960), Jean-Patrick Lescarboura — France v England (1985), Diego Dominguez — Italy v Scotland (2000), Neil Jenkins — Wales v Scotland (2001)	**5**	(France) Guy Camberabero — 1967, (Italy) Diego Dominguez — 2000, (Wales) Neil Jenkins — 2001, (England) Jonny Wilkinson — 2003, (Scotland) Dan Parks — 2010	**11**	(England) Jonny Wilkinson — 1998–2011

== Team ==
=== Match ===
- Most points by one team

- England v Italy 2001 80 points

- Most points by a losing team

- England v France 2026 46 points, 48-46

- Most points in one match

- England v Italy 2001 103 points, 80-23

- Most points in a drawn match

- England v Scotland 2019 76 points, 38-38

- Most tries by one team

- Scotland v Wales 1887 12 tries

- Most tries in one match

- Italy v France 2025 14 tries, 3-11

- Biggest winning margin

- England v Italy 2001 57 points 80-23

- Biggest away winning margin

- England v Wales 2025 54 points 68-14

=== Season ===
- Most points scored in a season

- England 2001 229 points

- Most points conceded in a season

- Italy 2021 239 points

- Fewest points scored in a Six Nations season

- Italy 2004 42 points

- Fewest points conceded in a Six Nations season

- England 2003 46 points

- Most tries scored in a season

- France 2025 30 tries
- France 2026 30 tries

- Most tries conceded in a season

- Italy 2021 34 tries

- Fewest tries scored in a Six Nations season

- Italy 2004 2 tries
- Italy 2009 2 tries

- Fewest tries conceded in a Six Nations season

- Wales 2008 2 tries

- Most tries in a season

- 2026 111 tries (7.4 per match)

- Biggest points difference in a season

- England 2001 +149

- Weakest points difference in a season

- Italy 2021 -184

== See also ==
- Six Nations Championship
- List of Six Nations Championship hat-tricks
- List of Six Nations Championship Player of the Championship winners
