= Bill Stewart (rugby union) =

Scottish rugby union player (1889–1958)

- Born: William Allan Stewart; 23 October 1889 Launceston, Tasmania, Australia
- Died: 29 April 1958 (aged 68) Fitzroy, Victoria, Australia

Rugby union career
- Position: Wing
Amateur team(s)
Years	Team	Apps	(Points)
- London Scottish
1912-1914	London Hospital		
Provincial / State sides
Years	Team	Apps	(Points)
1912	Whites Trial		
1913	Scotland Probables		
1913	Anglo-Scots		
International career
Years	Team	Apps	(Points)
1913-14	Scotland	4	(24)

Bill Stewart (23 October 1889 – 29 April 1958) was a Scotland international rugby union player.

== Rugby Union career ==
=== Amateur career ===
He played rugby union in Tasmania, before travelling to Great Britain.

He played for London Scottish but could only get a match in their 2nd XV.

He then moved and played rugby union for London Hospital.

=== Provincial career ===
He played for Whites Trial on 21 December 1912.

He played for Scotland Probables on 18 January 1913.

He played for Anglo-Scots against Provinces District on 27 December 1913.

=== International career ===
The Scottish Referee of 26 June 1911 notes that Stewart is 'of Scottish parentage and a native of Inverness'.

He was capped 4 times for the Scotland international rugby union team between 1913 and 1914. He scored 8 tries in the 4 matches.

His 4 tries in a match against Ireland, is second only to George Campbell Lindsay scoring 5 tries in a match against Wales in 1887, although the 4 tries in a match has been equalled a few times, most recently by Kyle Steyn against Tonga in 2021.

Stewart was noted as the first 'Flying Scotsman', the others being Eric Liddell and then Ian Smith. However it was noted that Smith was the best of the three, as Stewart and Liddell were essentially converted sprinters to rugby union; whilst Smith was an extremely fast rugby union player. The Dundee Courier of 17 January 1929 recording the difference:

Scotland has been lucky in being able to place at least one "Flying Scotsman" on a three-quarter wing for a good number of seasons. Her good fortune started in 1913, when the selectors discovered W. A. Stewart, of London Hospital, who played four times for his country in 1913 and 1914. Then, when things seemed so hopeless after the war, Caledonia produced Eric Liddell, the champion runner. Liddell started his 6 international career in 1922. Stewart had proved to be merely a runner, and it cannot be said that Liddell was much more than a sprinter either, as he did not play a " heady" game. It was left to Ian Smith, his successor, show that speed and brains could be combined at Rugby football.

== Athletics career ==
The Dundee Courier of 28 December 1912 noted that:

Stewart is new to international [rugby union] football. He is Tasmanian with good Scottish credentials, and is the holder of the 100 and 220 Scottish amateur athletic championships.

Stewart was a Scottish champion sprinter. From The Scottish Referee newspaper of Monday 20 January 1913:

There seems good reason to fancy that the Rugby Union Selectors have unearthed in W. A. Stewart, the Scottish champion sprinter, a gem of the first water, and anticipating their selection, we should say that he will be included in every International match of the season. At the beginning of this season he was reckoned a player only value for his place in the second team of the London Scottish, but a man possessed of such outstanding merit was bound to come to the front, and, like a name: of his he has jumped right from the junior Scottish side to Internationalist, and, let us say, one of the best of modern times. Stewart is one of the grandest players we have had in Scotland for a long time, and there seems every reason to hope that he will be able to assist his country, both in the Rugby and athletic fields for many a year.

And from the same newspaper of Monday 17 March 1913:

W. A STEWART, London Hospital F.C, Although Scotland has had a few lean seasons recently, events point to the Thistle occupying a much more important position in the Rugby world in the near future. It is now six seasons since Scotland won the International Championship, and at one time there mere hopes that this season she would occupy that proud position, but those hopes were rudely shattered, not through the inability of the men to play the game, but through accidents, which deprived us of the services of many fine players. The trials disclosed many men capable of great things, and one of them was W. A. Stewart., who has now had the honour of representing Scotland in a dual capacity. When it is considered that Stewart was only playing second-rate football a year ago, his advance has been phenomenal, and although yet he is not a football artist, there are indications that he will be one of the greatest finds Scotland has had in recent years. Against Wales he did not get a chance —none of the backs did; but against Ireland it was his resolute - running that won the day. Unfortunately for Scotland, he was unable to turn out against England, when a runner a yard or two faster than Sutherland might have rounded Coates. In his other capacity he has proved of yeoman service. In 1911 he won the 100 yards S.A.A. championship, and the following year enhanced his reputation by carrying off both the 100 and 220 yards, depriving R. C. Duncan of both honours. He has accomplished a number of splendid performances representing the United Hospitals, and in the South is regarded as one of the best of British amateur sprinters. Stewart is certain to represent Scotland in many more representative games.

== Medical career ==
He was a medical student attached to London Hospital.

== Military career ==
In the First World War he joined the Royal Army Medical Corps. The Edinburgh Evening News of 16 June 1915 noted that he returned from the front, injured after being shot in the ankle:

Lieutenant W. A. Stewart, of the R.A.M.C., the Scottish sprint champion and Rugby international, who was wounded in the ankle in Festubert, is home from the front.

== Family ==
His father was William Robert Stewart (1852-1939), and his mother was Alexandra Louise Button (1863-1954). Both were born in Tasmania, which somewhat belies the Scottish Referee assertion of Scottish parentage. However, there were Scottish familial roots. William Robert Stewart's father [and hence Bill Stewart's grandfather], Dr. William Robert Stewart (died 1874), was Scottish and was a member of the Scottish Kirk in Evandale, Tasmania.

Bill Stewart was the only son of William and Alexandra's 4 children.
