= Tommy Macpherson =

British Army officer (1920–2014)

Sir Tommy Macpherson CBE, MC & Two Bars, TD, DL
- Born: 4 October 1920; Edinburgh, Scotland
- Died: 6 November 2014 (aged 94)
- Relatives: Ian Macpherson, 1st Baron Strathcarron (uncle); Phil Macpherson (brother); Niall Macpherson, 1st Baron Drumalbyn (brother)
- Military career
- Allegiance: United Kingdom
- Branch: British Army
- Service years: 1939–1968
- Rank: Colonel
- Nickname: "Kilted Killer"
- Commands: 1st Battalion, London Scottish (1961–64)
- Conflicts: Second World War
- Awards: Knight Bachelor; Commander of the Order of the British Empire; Military Cross & Two Bars; Territorial Decoration; Knight of the Legion of Honour (France); Croix de Guerre (France); Silver Medal of Military Valour (Italy)

Colonel Sir Ronald Thomas Stewart Macpherson, CBE, MC & Two Bars, TD, DL (4 October 1920 – 6 November 2014), known as Tommy Macpherson, was a highly decorated British Army officer during and after the Second World War. He fought with No. 11 Commando unit and French Resistance forces, becoming infamous among Axis forces as the "Kilted Killer". He caused so much damage to enemy military infrastructure, a bounty of 300,000 francs was placed upon his head. Three times he received the Military Cross, the French Croix de Guerre, and the Legion of Honour.

== Early life ==
Ronald Thomas Stewart Macpherson was born in Edinburgh. He was the youngest of seven children of Sir Thomas Stewart Macpherson and Helen, the daughter of the Reverend Archibald Borland Cameron. His father's brother was the first Baron Strathcarron and one of his own brothers, Niall, was also raised to the peerage as Baron Drumalbyn. Another brother was G. P. S. (Phil) Macpherson, captain of Scotland's first Grand Slam winning rugby side in 1925. The family originates from Newtonmore, in the Highlands, yet he was raised in the city.

His childhood home was Edgebrooke, in East Fettes Avenue, and he attended Edinburgh Academy preparatory school before Cargilfield, in Barnton. At 14, he went to Fettes College, where he joined the Officers' Training Corps. He also attended Trinity College, Oxford, where he was awarded a first class degree in Philosophy, Politics and Economics. He represented Oxford at rugby, hockey and athletics and was also an international student athlete, representing the UK in the 1500 Meters at the 1947 Universiade, the precursor of the World Student Games.

== Military career ==
Macpherson was commissioned in the Queen's Own Cameron Highlanders Territorial Army in 1939, before serving in No. 11 (Scottish) Commando in 1940–1941.

Macpherson was part of a four-man team sent to reconnoitre beaches in preparation for Operation Flipper, an attempted raid on the headquarters of the Generaloberst Erwin Rommel. In two canvas folboats, they waited at sea for their rendezvous with a submarine which was to return them to their base at Apollonia. After two nights, the submarine had not appeared and one boat was leaking, so the men decided to land again and make a final attempt in one boat, but in the end the weather was too bad. They then decided to walk to Tobruk, despite the fact they had no food, water or maps, and were dressed only in shorts. Captain Ratcliffe and Lieutenant Ravenscroft were captured on 2 November, Macpherson and Corporal Evans managed to hold out for another day before they too were captured by Italian forces near Derna. Interrogated by four army officers and six carabinieri, one asked MacPherson to demonstrate how his Colt Automatic worked, he did so "by putting in a spare magazine [he] still had, and then held the party up with the loaded weapon". He then suffered a severe attack of cramp, and was recaptured and placed in solitary confinement. He made one further escape attempt before being taken to Italy in a destroyer, and held in a prisoner of war camp at Montalbo; here he made a further escape attempt, breaching the inner perimeter, but he could not find a way over the outer fence. In June 1942 he was moved to another camp at Gavi, near Genoa.

After the Italian armistice the camp was taken over by German forces on 9 September 1943, and the prisoners transferred to German prisoner of war camps from 14 September when they were taken by road to Acqui. From here they were to be taken by train to Austria. Macpherson managed to get away from his guards, but was soon recaptured, and almost shot; fortunately the order by a feldwebel (NCO) was countermanded by an officer. The prisoners were then transported by train to Stalag XVIII-A at Spittal an der Drau, Austria. On arrival at this camp, Macpherson and a New Zealander, Captain Colin Norman Armstrong managed to hide from the Germans whenever they tried to take a roll call, and obtained assistance from the French held in a different part of the camp, escaping in French uniforms on 21 September, also accompanied by a Captain A. A. Yeoman. They managed to recross the Italian border, and were intending to make their way into Yugoslavia and link up with Allied-supported partisans there. Unfortunately, Armstrong became separated, and on 26 September Macpherson and Armstrong ran into a German patrol near Chiusaforte, Macpherson spoke to the patrol in Italian, pretending to be an Italian officer, and tried to convince the patrol that Armstrong was Croatian. The Red Cross rations they were carrying revealed their true status, and they were sent to a camp in Hohenstein, arriving on 30 September after a five-day train journey with only a small amount of bread to eat and little water. On 1 October they were transferred to Stalag XX-A at Toruń, Poland. On 9 October they escaped again, with assistance from Private Hutson and Sergeant Glancy. The four then managed to travel to Sweden via Bromberg and Gdynia; flying back to Kinloss, Scotland on 4 November 1943, two years after he had been captured in Egypt. On 17 February 1944, Macpherson was awarded the Military Cross (MC) for his escape.

=== Operation Jedburgh – France ===
Within a few days of returning to Great Britain, Macpherson was instructed to report to Milton Hall in the Soke of Peterborough. There he discovered he was to be part of Operation Jedburgh. Under this operation three-man units were to be dropped into occupied Europe to carry out sabotage and guerrilla warfare, acting as a high-profile focus for the local resistance. His training lasted from January to March 1944, at the end of which he was promoted to Major and placed in charge of team Quinine. His team members were a French lieutenant, Michel de Bourbon, and a British radio operator, Sergeant Arthur Brown.

On the night of 8 June they were parachuted into Aurillac to liaise with a resistance unit led by Bernard Cournil. Under his jumping smock, Macpherson was wearing full Cameron Highland battle dress, including a tartan kilt. "Just as I arrived I heard an excited young Frenchman saying to his boss, 'Chef, chef, there's a French officer and he's brought his wife!". "Their mistaking me for a woman wearing a skirt was an easy error to make." He later explained, "As a British officer parachuted into a resistance situation... your only authority was your own personality, which I had tried to reinforce with my kilt and a degree of flamboyance".

To motivate the resistance unit, Macpherson decided on immediate action. On the next night (9 June) they demolished a railway bridge on the Aurillac-Maurs line. The following day they were contacted by two resistance fighters from Bretenoux, who told Macpherson that the 2nd SS Panzer Division Das Reich were advancing towards the Normandy beachhead via the Figeac-Tulle road. Macpherson realised that the best they could do was delay the division's progress by preparing a series of ambushes. During the night they mined the road and the surrounding trees. At the first ambush they blew the tracks off the leading armoured vehicle, thus blocking the road. Then, as the Germans began to work through the trees to outflank them, the resistance fighters brought down the trees and withdrew.

They then switched to attacking road and rail routes between Brive and Montauban, eventually completely stopping railway traffic between Cahors and Souillac, Lot on 1 July. Similar operations continued through July, and following Operation Dragoon (the Allied invasion of Southern France, aimed at capturing Marseille), operations increased in scale. In one attack Macpherson and his men trapped 300 Germans and 100 members of the Milice (Pro-German French forces) in a railway tunnel for several days.

Over the course of the next two months Macpherson killed or captured many German troops and blew apart bridges. He operated from caves and woodland areas with his radio operator. Under the mantle of Agent Quinine, he achieved an operation of some kind virtually every day, – he toured the countryside in a black Citroën with a Union Flag pennant on one side and a Croix de Lorraine on the other – infuriating the Nazis to the extent that they placed a 300,000 franc bounty on his head, describing him as "A bandit masquerading as a Scottish officer and extremely dangerous to the citizens of France".

On one occasion when a German staff car was approaching a level crossing Macpherson booby-trapped the barrier arm so it crashed down on the vehicle, decapitating the local commandant and his driver.

As Axis forces in the south of France were cut off by the Allied advance, Macpherson negotiated the surrender of two German units, the most notable being FK541. This was an assortment of Axis forces, totaling 23,000 men and while mainly second line soldiers it did include 7000 front line troops. It was the command of Major General Botho Henning Elster. (Note: Also referred to as Erich Elster) Macpherson was informed by another Jedburgh leader Captain Arthur Cox that the Major General wanted to negotiate surrender. A meeting had already been held with the Americans, conducted by Lieutenant Samuel Magill, but it was felt that Germans were prevaricating, so another meeting was set up in a village in Allied hands.

Unarmed and accompanied by a German doctor and a French officer, Macpherson was driven in a captured German Red Cross vehicle through miles of enemy-held territory, through machine gun fire, to the village's school house. Dressed in full Highland uniform complete with bonnet, he bluffed that he would unleash heavy artillery and call on the RAF if the Germans did not surrender. The Major General agreed on condition his forces were allowed to keep their side arms until they were in safe custody of the US 83rd infantry division. (Note: When the Allied officers were interviewed by the press immediately after the surrender, Lieutenant Samuel Magill did the talking, but Macpherson, as trained, said nothing. Hence many histories credit this surrender solely due to the efforts of the US 83rd Infantry Division.)

=== Italian partisans ===
In November 1944, Major Macpherson led Italian partisans in several major attacks on railways in Udine, northern Italy, despite being wounded soon after his arrival. Much of this effort was aimed at disrupting the German defensive line based on Tarvisio. On one occasion during an Allied air raid Macpherson spotted a group of Italian officers retreating into a bomb shelter. The Scot opened the shelter hatch and threw a grenade down it. Macpherson was shot by an Italian officer, who arrived late but whom he succeeded in stabbing after a struggle.

=== Post war ===
After the war Macpherson reverted to the rank of lieutenant and continued to serve in the Territorial Army (TA) with the Camerons. He was promoted back to captain on 1 September 1948, and awarded the Territorial Decoration on 20 June 1950. During this period (1947 to 1952) he was attached to 21 Special Air Service Regiment (Artists). On 2 August 1960 he was promoted back to major, and transferred to the Gordon Highlanders. He was promoted lieutenant-colonel on 31 October 1961, and until 1 November 1964 he commanded the London Scottish TA, he was then promoted colonel. He transferred to Class III of the reserve on 1 April 1967, and was appointed a Commander of the Order of the British Empire (CBE) in the 1968 New Year Honours. His CBE was for his services as deputy commander of 56th Infantry Brigade from 1964 to 1967, and his efforts in support of the TA in general. He was a member of the Royal Company of Archers.

On 7 October 2010, Macpherson's autobiography was published under the title, Behind Enemy Lines.

== Businessman ==
Macpherson had enjoyed a successful business career, including periods variously as the Managing Director and Chairman of the Mallinson-Denny Group, as a director of Brooke Bond Group, Scottish Mutual Assurance and the National Coal Board, and as Chairman of Annington Holdings plc and Boustead plc. While with Mallinson Denny, he was a member of the National Board for Prices and Incomes between 1965 and 1967. He was President of Eurochambres (the Association of European Chambers of Commerce) between 1992 and 1994.

== Personal life ==
In 1953 Macpherson married Jean Henrietta, the daughter of David Butler Wilson. She is a patroness of the Royal Caledonian Ball. They had two sons and a daughter. Macpherson's Highlands seat was Balavil House, near Newtonmore, in the heart of the ancestral lands of the Clan Macpherson.

Macpherson was appointed a Deputy Lieutenant of Greater London in 1977, and served as High Sheriff of Greater London in 1983. He was knighted in the 1992 New Year Honours, receiving the accolade from the Queen at Buckingham Palace on 17 March 1992. In 1985/86 he served as Prime Warden of the Worshipful Company of Dyers and between 2001 and 2005 he was President of the Highland Society of London.

Beside his British decorations, he was also a Knight of the Legion of Honour and was awarded the Croix de Guerre (2 Palms and Star) and was personally awarded a papal knighthood from the Pope.

== Death ==
Macpherson died aged 94 on 6 November 2014. A memorial service was held at St Columba's Church of Scotland in Pont Street, Knightsbridge, London, with the eulogy given by Malcolm Rifkind. Others present included Jeffrey Archer and his wife, Mary, and Mr & Mrs Alexander Hay of Duns Castle, Berwickshire.
