= Phil Macpherson =

Scotland international rugby union player

Phil Macpherson CBE TD
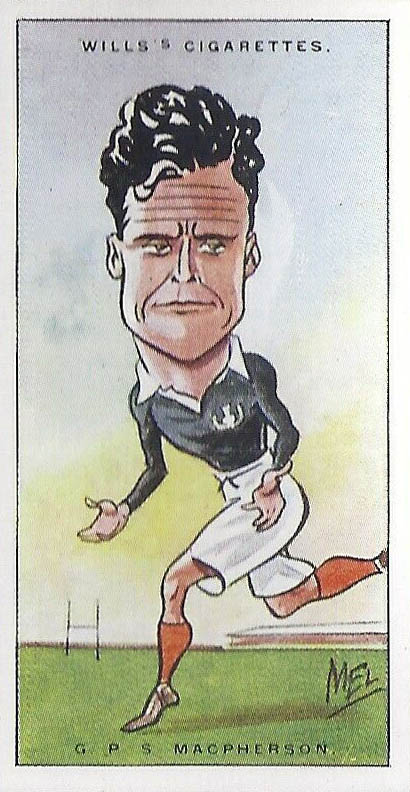
- Full name: George Philip Stewart Macpherson
- Born: 16 November 1903 Newtonmore, Scotland
- Died: 2 March 1981 (aged 77)
- School: Fettes College
- University: Oxford University

Rugby union career
- Position: Centre
Amateur team(s)
| Years | Team | Apps | (Points) |
- Oxford University RFC
- Edinburgh Academical FC
| 1929 | Barbarian F.C. | | |
International career
| Years | Team | Apps | (Points) |
| 1922–1932 | Scotland | 26 | (12) |

George Philip Stewart Macpherson CBE TD (16 October 1903 – 2 March 1981) also known as GPS Macpherson was a Scottish rugby union footballer who played for Scotland in 26 tests between 1922 and 1932.

== Early life ==
Macpherson was born in Newtonmore in Badenoch, Scotland, one of seven children of Sir Thomas Stewart Macpherson CIE LLD and Helen, the daughter of the Reverend Archibald Borland Cameron. His father's brother was the first Baron Strathcarron and one of his own brothers, Niall, was also raised to the peerage as Baron Drumalbyn. Another brother was Sir Ronald Thomas Stewart Macpherson.

He attended Fettes College in Edinburgh. From there he attended Oriel College, Oxford. At Oxford University, his rugby talents saw him selected for Oxford University RFC.

== International rugby ==
It was from there he was first selected for Scotland in 1922 when he played in all four of Scotland's Five Nations matches. He next played for Scotland in 1924, and scored his first international try against Wales on 2 February that year. He only played one other international that year—a Calcutta Cup match against England national rugby union team.

The following year Macpherson was selected as Scotland's captain. As captain, he took Scotland to their first ever Five Nations Grand Slam—that is, wins over England, Wales, Ireland and France in one season. The first match of the season was against France at Inverleith on 25 January. MacPherson was one of the most influential members of the team that eventually won 25–4. Scotland's next match was against Wales in which Macpherson also played. The match was played away in Swansea and Scotland eventually won 24–14 after leading 24–5 at one point. Macpherson did not play against Ireland, where Scotland still won 14–8. MacPherson returned for Scotland's last match of the tournament against England. The match was played at Murrayfield Stadium which had just been completed. It was played in front on 70,000 spectators. After trailing England 11–5, Scotland scored a try that involved several players, including Macpherson to reduce the deficit to 11–10. After a drop goal Scotland took a 14–11 lead. They held their lead to win their first ever Grand Slam.

Macpherson missed the 1926 Five Nations Championship while studying for a year at Yale in the US, but returned in 1927 and continued to play for Scotland until the conclusion of the 1931/32 season. With Scotland he shared the 1927 Five Nations Championships with Ireland, and won the Championship outright in 1929. The only match he ever played against a touring southern hemisphere team was against South Africa in 1932.

== Retirement ==
Macpherson became vice president of merchant bank Kleinwort Benson between 1961 and 1969. Macpherson received an Honorary Doctorate from Heriot-Watt University in 1971. In the 1976 New Year Honours, Macpherson was appointed a Commander of the Order of the British Empire (CBE) "for services to Greenwich Hospital."

In 2001, Macpherson was selected in Scotland's all-time greatest XV. He was also selected as Scotland's greatest ever attacking player. The selection was made via a poll conducted by Scottish Rugby Magazine and The Herald. In 2002 he was also inducted into the Scottish Sports Hall of Fame.
