= Tony Stanger =

British Lions & Scotland international rugby union player

- Born: Anthony George Stanger; 14 May 1968 (age 58) Hawick, Scotland
- University: University of Edinburgh (1999)
- Occupation: Director at Stanger Pro Limited (2015–present)

Rugby union career
- Position: Wing and Centre
Senior career
Years	Team	Apps	(Points)
1985–2001	Hawick		
–	Borders		
–	Edinburgh		
–	Grenoble		
–	Leeds Tykes		
International career
Years	Team	Apps	(Points)
1989–1999	Scotland	52	(106)
1997	British and Irish Lions	1	
Coaching career
- Years: Team
- 2001–2004: Leeds Tykes
- 2004–2008: London Irish (Speed and skills)

Anthony George Stanger (born 14 May 1968) is a Scottish former international rugby union player. With 24 international tries, he was Scotland's joint record try scorer, along with Ian Smith, until that record was broken by Stuart Hogg in November 2021. His regular playing positions were Wing and Centre.

== Early life ==
Stanger was born in Hawick in the Scottish Borders. He attended university at the University of Edinburgh, where he earned a Bachelor of Science in Applied Sport Sciences – 1st Class Honours (1999).

== Rugby career ==
Stanger played rugby for Scotland at under 18, 19 and 21 levels. He went on the Scotland rugby team's tour of Japan. He was selected to start for Scotland against Fiji in October 1989, without playing for the Scotland B side. He scored the winning try in the 1990 Five Nations match against England to seal Scotland's third Grand Slam. He played for Scotland at the 1991 and 1995 Rugby World Cups.

In 1997, Stanger was called up to replace Ieuan Evans, who was injured on tour with the British Lions in South Africa 1997, and Stanger gained one cap on the tour.

== Later and personal life ==
Since retiring from playing, Stanger has moved on to other pursuits, mainly in the areas of coaching and guidance for professional sportspeople. He received an Honorary Degree of Doctor of Education from University of Edinburgh in June 2007.

Stanger worked as a Talent Manager with the Scottish Institute of Sport from 2008 to 2015, then served as Director at performance agency Stanger Pro alongside his New Zealand-born wife Bid. Their son George is a footballer who began his career at Stirling Albion before moving to Hamilton Academical in 2018, also being selected for New Zealand Under-20s.
