= George Campbell Lindsay =

Scotland international rugby union player

George Lindsay
- Born: George Campbell Lindsay; 3 January 1863 Edinburgh, Scotland
- Died: 5 April 1905 (aged 42) Hampstead, England

Rugby union career
- Position: Three-quarters
Amateur team(s)
Years	Team	Apps	(Points)
- Fettesian-Lorettonians
–	Oxford University		
–	London Scottish		
International career
Years	Team	Apps	(Points)
1884–87	Scotland	4	(0)

George Campbell Lindsay (3 January 1863 – 5 April 1905) was a Scotland international rugby union player.

== Rugby Union career ==
=== Amateur career ===
He played for Fettesian-Lorettonians, Oxford University and London Scottish.

=== International career ===
The South Wales Echo of 6 January 1886 reported the comments of Scotch Haggis when reviewing Lindsay's selection in the Scotland side to face Wales at Cardiff in January 1886:

G. C. Lindsay is much thought of by the F.L's, but beyond that charmed circle there is great diversity of opinion as to his merits as a player. He is certainly not a consistent player, and another thing I have against him is he does not play a good losing game. Against the West of Scotland he was a dreadful frost, and those who prophesied a place for him in the National team were laughed at. But, much as I was disappointed with the Oxonian's play at Partick, I could not forget the broad glaring fact that Lindsay in England, and also against Edinburgh University, had accomplished great deeds, and it was these great deeds the union officials had to consider. Had there been a better half in Scotland, I would have left Lindsay out in the cold, but as he is in advance of all the men we have, the union had no alternative but to give him a place, and I really believe they have acted wisely in the matter.

Lindsay holds the record for the most number of tries by one player in a Six Nations match having scored 5 tries against Wales in the 1887 tournament (then the Home Championship). Scotland went on to win the championship that season.

Lindsay played in four international competitions in total between 1884 and 1887. His second appearance, against Ireland in 1885, was in an abandoned game, but he did not represent his country in the replay.

== Family ==
His father was Thomas Steven Lindsay (1832-1897) and his mother Margaret Gemmell Sawers (1827-1907). He was one of their 5 children.

== Death ==
His death was reported in the Morning Post of 6 April 1905:

DEATH OF MR. G. C. LINDSAY. Mr. George Campbell Lindsay, the old Oxford captain and Scottish International three-quarter back, died on Thursday evening after a brief illness at his mother's residence in Hampstead. He was in his forty third year. Mr. Lindsay's great playing days were in the Eighties. He got his blue his first year, when be went up Oxford from Loretto, and in February 1833 he was a member Harry Vassall's ever-famous Oxford fifteen; two seasons later succeeded to the captaincy and afterwards be got into the Scottish fifteen. Lindsay possessed great pace, and had a beautiful drop kick, "one of the best we ever had" to quote the late Dr. Almond, of Loretto. Once when twitted with not being much of a tackler Lindsay retorted that in his days at Oxford there was no occasion to tackle when they had behind them the greatest fullback that ever played – H. B. Tristram, the present Head of Loretto. Lindsay was a good cricketer and golfer, while also got his athletic blue in 1886, and was only beaten in the Quarter by H.C. L. Tindall at Lillie Bridge by a few inches in 51 seconds. He will be particularly missed from London and Oxford football circles, for of late years had devoted himself to writing on the Rugby game in the Sporting Life under initials of G. C. L. The funeral will take place at half-past one to-day at Hampstead Cemetery, Finchley Road.

== See also ==
- List of Six Nations Championship records
