= Pierre Albaladejo =

French rugby union player (born 1933)

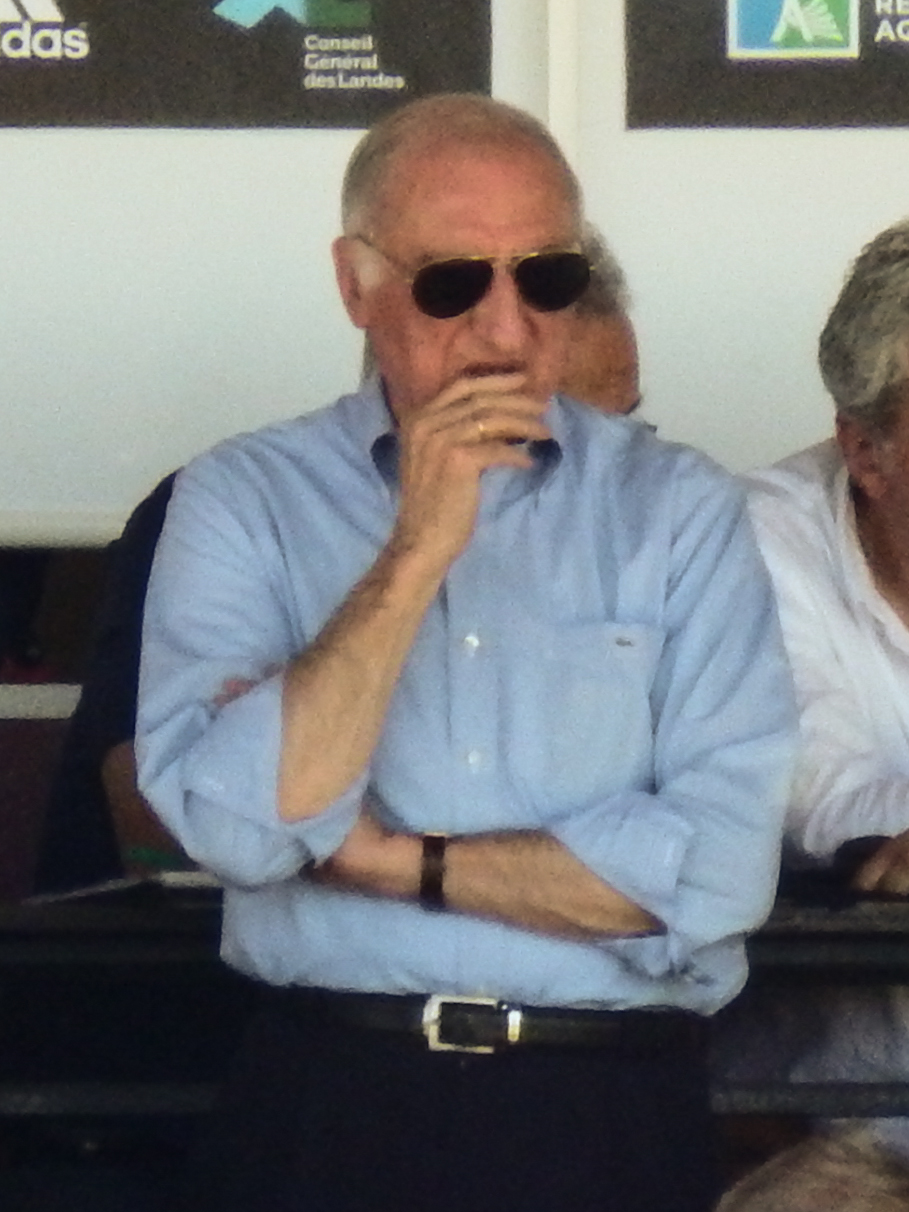
- Albaladejo in 2015
- Born: Pierre Albaladejo; 14 December 1933 (age 92) Dax, France

Rugby union career
- Position(s): Full back, fly-half
Amateur team(s)
Years	Team	Apps	(Points)
1952-1966	US Dax		
International career
Years	Team	Apps	(Points)
1954–1964	France	30	(104)

Pierre Albaladejo (born 14 December 1933) is a French former rugby union player. His usual position was at fly-half or at fullback.

He played all his career for Dax, from 1952/53 to 1965/66.

He had 30 caps for France, from 1954 to 1964, scoring 16 conversions, 12 penalties and 12 drop goals, 104 points on aggregate.

He achieved the rank of Officer in France's Legion of Honour.

== See also ==
- Legion of Honour
- Legion of Honour Museum
- List of Legion of Honour recipients by name (A)
- Ribbons of the French military and civil awards
