= Ian Smith (rugby union, born 1903) =

British Lions & Scotland international rugby union player

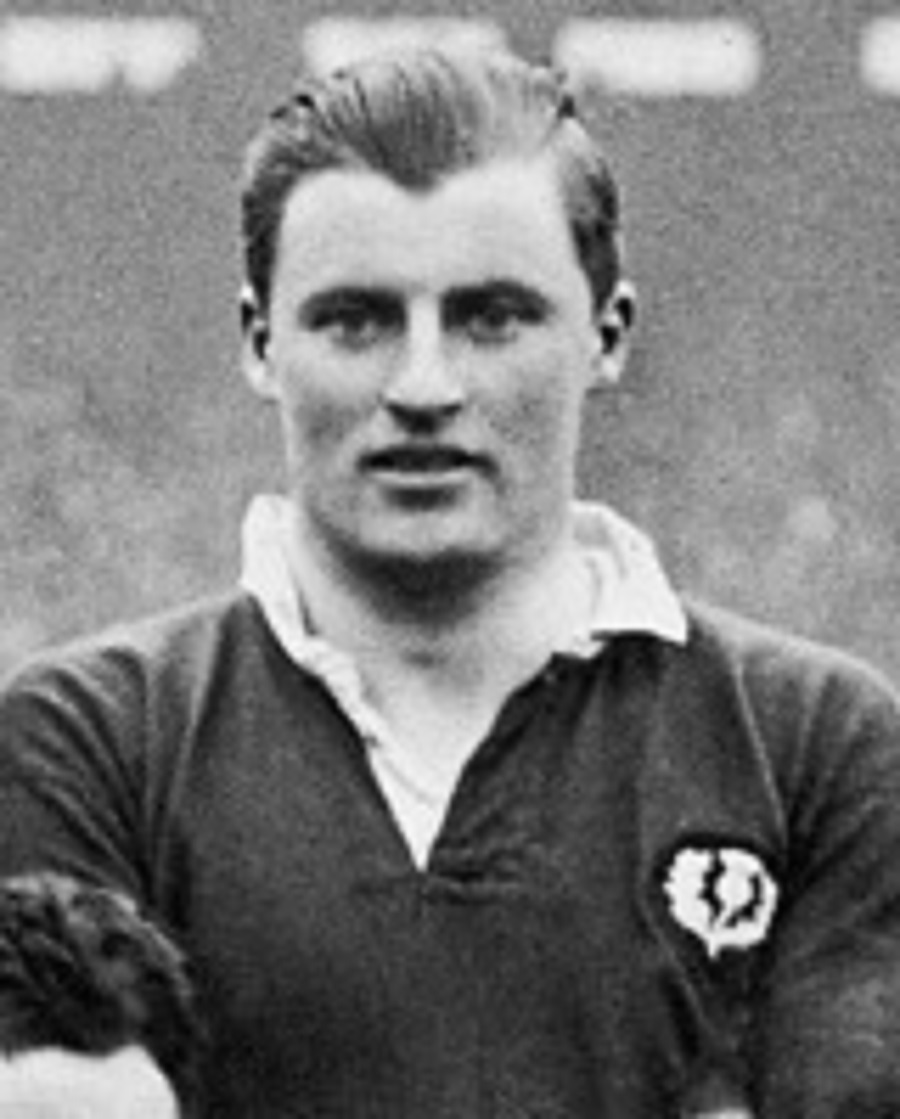
- Born: Ian Scott Smith; 31 October 1903 Melbourne, Australia
- Died: 18 September 1972 (aged 68)
- School: Winchester College
- University: Oxford, Edinburgh
- Occupation: solicitor

Rugby union career
- Position: Wing
Amateur team(s)
Years	Team	Apps	(Points)
1923–25	Oxford University		
1924–25	Barbarians		
1925–29	Edinburgh University		
1929–	London Scottish		
International career
Years	Team	Apps	(Points)
1924–33	Scotland	32	(72)
1924	British Isles	2	(0)

Ian Scott Smith (31 October 1903 – 18 September 1972) was a rugby union wing who played 32 Tests for Scotland and two Tests for the British Isles. Born in Melbourne, Australia, and brought up in New Zealand, Smith moved to England and was educated at Winchester College, before studying at Oxford University and later Edinburgh University. At Oxford he took up rugby and was eventually selected for Scotland, for whom he was eligible because of his Scottish parents. He toured with the British Isles (now known as the British and Irish Lions) to South Africa in 1924, and played all four matches in Scotland's first ever Five Nations Grand Slam in 1925. He represented Scotland until 1933 when he captained them in their Triple Crown winning season. His 24 international tries, all scored in the Five Nations or Home Nations, was an international record until 1987 and a record for the Five/Six Nations until 2011. His Scottish record stood for 88 years until 2021, when it was broken by Stuart Hogg.

== Biography ==
Smith was born in Melbourne in Australia in 1903, but was brought up in New Zealand. He was educated at Winchester College, where they did not play rugby, and then went to Oxford University. It was at Oxford that he was persuaded to play rugby by GPS Macpherson. Up until then he had only played association football. Macpherson captained Oxford when Smith played in the Varsity Match against Cambridge in 1923 – Smith scored two tries in Oxford's victory.

Smith had Scottish parents and ancestors from the Borders region, and so was eligible to play for Scotland. He was first capped for Scotland when he faced Wales on 2 February 1924, and he scored three tries on Test debut; a 35–10 victory. He played in Scotland's remaining 1924 Five Nations matches – against Ireland and a Calcutta Cup match against England – although he was unable to score again. In 1924 he was invited to play for the Barbarians for their annual encounter with East Midlands for the Mobbs Memorial Match. Smith scored one of five tries for the Barbarians during the game to win 15–3. He played in a total of six matches for the Barbarians, including five games during the club's 1923 and 1924 Easter tours.

In the second half of 1924 he was selected to tour South Africa with the British Isles. It was on this tour that the British Isles were first given the "Lions" nickname. Smith played in the first two Tests of the tour, both of them lost. He also played four non-Test matches during the tour, including one against Rhodesia where he scored two tries. Rowe Harding, an opponent with Wales and a team-mate with the 1924 Lions, reckoned Smith to be the "greatest wing of all time".

In 1925 Smith played in all four of Scotland's Five Nations matches. The first was against France at Inverleith, where Smith scored four tries, and helped them to win 25–4. He then played against Wales at Swansea and scored another four tries; Scotland again won, this time 24–14. Their third game of the Championship was against Ireland at Lansdowne Road, and although Smith was unable to score this time, Scotland still won 14–8. Scotland's last match of the Championship was against England at Murrayfield Stadium. This was the first match ever played at Murrayfield, and was watched by over 70,000 spectators. Although Smith did not score himself, he was involved in a crucial Scottish try: the ball was passed through several hands before Smith passed to Johnnie Wallace who scored in the right-hand corner. English supporters claimed Smith had put his foot into touch, but the Welsh referee disagreed and awarded the try. Eventually Scotland triumphed 14–11 to go undefeated and claim their first ever Five Nations Grand Slam. Smith's eight tries for a single Championship equalled the record set by Cyril Lowe in 1914, a feat only repeated 100 years later by Louis Bielle-Biarrey in the 2025 edition of the Championship.

Smith continued to play for Scotland throughout the 1920s. He played all four Scotland matches in the 1926 Five Nations, and scored two tries against England at Twickenham; his only tries of the Championship. He played three matches in 1927, this times scoring four tries, two against France and two against England. In both 1926 and 1927 Scotland shared the Five Nations Championship with Ireland. Smith did not play in 1928, but returned in 1929, when Scotland won the Five Nations again. He played all four matches, and scored three tries, two against England.

In 1930 Smith played three Five Nations' matches, missing the England game, and did not score any tries. He did play all four matches in 1931, and scored his only tries of the Championship in the game against England. This was the fourth time he scored two tries in a match against England. In January 1932 Smith played for Scotland against South Africa, which was won 6–3 by South Africa. By 1932 France had been ejected from the Championship due to allegations of professionalism, and the four Home Nations returned to only playing one another for the International Championship. (Note: This was the format prior to France joining in 1910. France were readmitted after the 1939 tournament, but did not compete in the competition until 1947 due to the Second World War.) Smith played all three matches in 1932, but scored only once, against England.

In 1933, Smith captained Scotland for the Home Nations Championship. Because of his background of playing association football, teammate James Henderson said of Smith:

He was great, of course, 'The Flying Scotsman', but when he was our captain in the 1933 Triple Crown success, we never had team talks before the game. He would just tell us to get on with it; no great plans or anything, because he didn't know much about the game."

Smith played in all three matches during the Championship, and scored one try when they played Wales in February. They played Ireland last after the planned match had been cancelled because of a blizzard. They won the match 8–6 and secured the Championship and the Triple Crown. It was Smith's last match for Scotland.

Smith studied accounting at the University of Edinburgh, and served in the Royal Army Ordnance Corps during the Second World War. Following the war he practised law, before retiring to Kelso in the Scottish Borders. In 2013 Smith was included in the second group of inductees into the Scottish Rugby Hall of Fame.

Rugby writer Richard Bath wrote of him:

A member of the famous Oxford quartet of Wallace, Aitken, Macpherson and Smith, the lithe Australian-born wing made his mark as an integral member of the outstanding sides of the 1920s, which won the Grand Slam in 1925, the year when he scored an astounding eight tries in the first two internationals of the season against France and Wales.

== Statistics and character ==
Smith played a total of 32 Tests for Scotland, and scored 24 tries, which still gives him a share of third place in the Scottish try record with Tony Stanger. Smith's record for international tries was not beaten until 1987 when it was overtaken by Australian David Campese. Remarkably, Smith's first 17 tries were scored in only 14 Test matches. His 24 career tries in the Five Nations – now Six Nations – remained a record until first equalled and then surpassed by Ireland's Brian O'Driscoll in 2011. Smith spent much of his playing career playing in the backline with GPS Macpherson; 21 of Smith's 24 Scotland tries were scored outside the three-quarter Macpherson. When Smith scored four tries against France in 1925, Macpherson contributed to all those scores.

Author Richard Bath wrote:

An exuberant young man, who once famously drove his car down an Edinburgh pavement after a post-international drinking binge, Smith held the record for tries scored (24), until he was overtaken by Australia's David Campese, 55 years after Smith retired to concentrate on his career as a solicitor.
