= Scotland national rugby union team =

Men's National rugby union squad

Scotland
- Emblem: Thistle
- Union: Scottish Rugby Union
- Head coach: Gregor Townsend
- Captain: Sione Tuipulotu
- Most caps: Ross Ford (110)
- Top scorer: Chris Paterson (809)
- Top try scorer: Darcy Graham (41)
- Home stadium: Murrayfield Stadium
First colours	Second colours

World Rugby ranking
- Current: 6 (as of 19 October 2026)
- Highest: 5 (2017, 2018, 2023, 2026)
- Lowest: 12 (2012, 2013, 2015)

First international
- Scotland 1–0 England (Edinburgh, Scotland; 27 March 1871)

Biggest win
- Scotland 100–8 Japan (Perth, Scotland; 13 November 2004)

Biggest defeat
- Scotland 10–68 South Africa (Edinburgh, Scotland; 6 December 1997)

World Cup
- Appearances: 10 (first in 1987)
- Best result: Fourth place (1991)
- Website: scottishrugby.org

The Scotland national rugby union team represents Scotland in men's international rugby union. Governed by the Scottish Rugby Union, the team takes part in the annual Six Nations Championship and the Rugby World Cup every four years. Scotland's home games are almost always played at Murrayfield Stadium in Edinburgh.

Scotland played the first official international test match, winning 1–0 against England at Raeburn Place. Scotland competed in the Five Nations from the inaugural tournament in 1883, winning it 14 times outright (including the final iteration in 1999) and sharing it eight times. However, they have never won the Six Nations since its 2000 inauguration.

Scotland have competed in all ten iterations of the Rugby World Cup; their best finish came in 1991, when they lost to New Zealand in the third place play-off. They have beaten all major rugby union nations with the exception of New Zealand, with whom they have had two draws. As of 19 October 2026, Scotland are sixth in the World Rugby Rankings.

== History ==
=== 1871–1924 ===
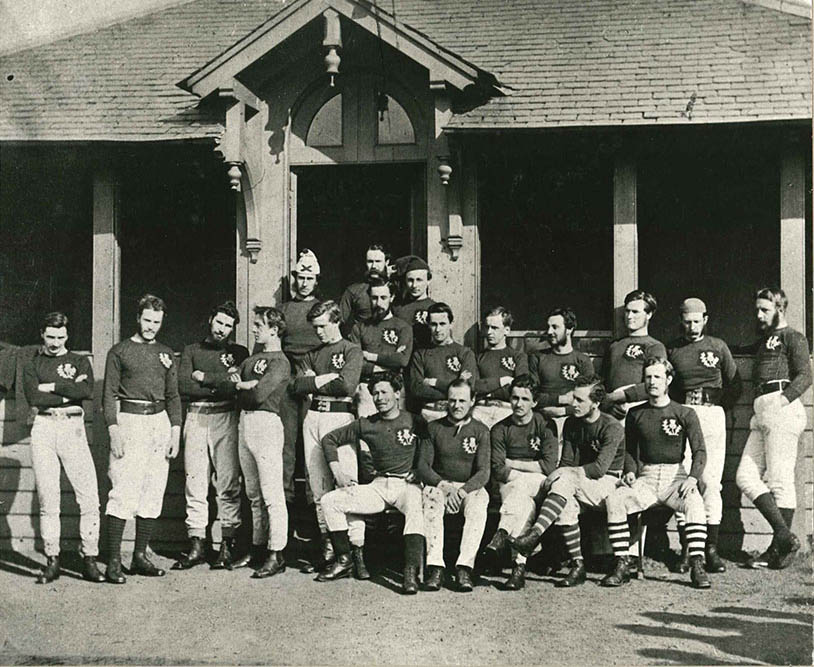
Scotland's first national team, 1871, for the 1st international, vs. England in Edinburgh

In December 1870 a group of Scots players issued a letter of challenge in The Scotsman and in Bell's Life in London, to play an England XX at rugby rules. This led to the first-ever rugby international match being played at Academical Cricket Club's ground at Raeburn Place, Edinburgh, on Monday 27 March 1871. In front of around 4,000 spectators, the Scots won the encounter by a try (made by Angus Buchanan) and a goal (made by William Cross) to a solitary try scored by England (a points scoring system had not then been devised so only the goal counted towards the 1–0 score). England later won the return match at the Kennington Oval, London in the following year.

The Calcutta Cup was donated to the Rugby Football Union in 1878 by the members of the short-lived Calcutta Rugby Club. The members had decided to disband: the cup was crafted from melted-down silver rupees which became available when the club's funds were withdrawn from the bank. The Cup is unique in that it is competed for annually only by England and Scotland. The first Calcutta Cup match was played in 1879 and, since that time, over 100 matches have taken place.

=== Origins of the Nations Championship ===
In 1882 the Home Nations Championship, the fore-runner of the modern Six Nations Championship was founded with Scotland, England, Wales and Ireland taking part. The Scots enjoyed occasional success in the early years, winning their first Triple Crown in 1891 and repeating the feat again in 1895, and vying with Wales for dominance in the first decade of the 20th century. Further Triple Crowns wins for Scotland followed in 1901, 1903 and 1907. However, Scotland's triumph in 1907 would be the last for eighteen years as the First World War (1914–1918) and England's dominance afterwards would deny them glory.

=== Home ground ===
In 1897 land was purchased by the SFU at Inverleith, Edinburgh. Thus the SFU became the first of the Home Unions to own its own ground. The first visitors were Ireland, on 18 February 1899 (Scotland 3–9 Ireland). International rugby was played at Inverleith until 1925. The SFU bought some land and built the first Murrayfield Stadium which was opened on 21 March 1925.

=== 1925–1945 ===
In 1925 Scotland already had victories over France at Inverleith (25–4), Wales in Swansea (24–14) and Ireland in Dublin (14–8). England, the Grand Slam champions of the two previous seasons were the first visitors to Murrayfield. 70,000 spectators saw the lead change hands three times before Scotland secured a 14–11 victory which gave them their first-ever Five Nations Grand Slam.

In 1926, Scotland became the first Home nation side to defeat England at Twickenham after England had won the Grand Slam five times in eight seasons.

The outbreak of the Second World War in September 1939 brought rugby union in Scotland to a halt. The SRU cancelled all arranged trial and international matches and encouraged the member clubs to carry on as best they could. Some clubs closed down, others amalgamated and carried on playing other local clubs and, sometimes, teams from the armed forces stationed in their various areas.

=== 1946–1987 ===
Internationals resumed in the 1946–47 season, although these were not formally recognised and no caps were awarded to participating players. In January 1946, Scotland played and defeated a strong New Zealand Armed Forces team by 11–6. Scotland resumed full international matches in February 1947, losing 22–8 to Wales at Murrayfield.

The period after World War Two was not a successful one for Scotland. In 1951, the touring Springboks massacred Scotland 44–0 scoring nine tries, a then record defeat. Scotland suffered 17 successive defeats between February 1951 and February 1955, scored only 54 points in these 17 games: 11 tries, six conversions, and four penalties.

The teams from 1955 to 1963 were an improvement. There were no wins over England, but three of the games were drawn. Occasional wins were recorded against Wales, Ireland and France. 1964 was a good year for Scotland. New Zealand were held to a 0–0 draw, the last international match in which no points were scored. The Calcutta Cup was won 15–6, the first time since 1950 and they shared the Five Nations title in 1964 with Wales.

In 1971 the SRU appointed Bill Dickinson as their head coach, after years of avoidance, as it was their belief that rugby should remain an amateur sport. He was officially designated as an "adviser to the captain". Scotland were the first of the Home Unions to run a truly nationwide club league. This was introduced in 1973 and still flourishes today with several of the country's original clubs still very much in evidence, such as Heriots, West of Scotland, Watsonians and the famous 'border' clubs such as Gala, Hawick, Jed-Forest, Kelso and Melrose. However the advent of professionalism saw Scotland's District championship abandoned and two 'Super Districts' formed, which have resulted in the top players generally being unavailable for their clubs. These teams play in international club competitions such as the Heineken Cup and the Pro14.

On 1 March 1975, around 104,000 spectators watched Scotland defeat Wales 12–10 in a Five Nations match at Murrayfield. The attendance at the time was a World Record for a Rugby Union match, and remains the record attendance at Murrayfield. That win was part of a run of nine successive wins at Murrayfield during the 1970s for the national side, but they were unable to transfer that form outwith Scotland, only managing two away wins during the decade. In 1977 Nairn McEwan succeeded Bill Dickinson as national coach. However, he was only able to win one international in his three years in charge. Nevertheless, rugby in Scotland was clearly developing. The establishment of the national leagues in 1973–74 was beginning to bear fruit; the standard of club and district rugby was higher than ever and players were more accustomed to experiencing pressure in matches where the result really mattered. Fewer players were being selected from English clubs to represent Scotland as the domestic game was producing an adequate number of players of genuine international class for the first time since the First World War.

Jim Telfer became national coach in 1980, inheriting a squad of genuine potential. In March 1982 Scotland won away in Wales for the first time in 20 years. Scotland toured Australia in July 1982 and won the first test, Scotland's first away victory against any of the big three Southern Hemisphere sides. After this, the 1983 season was a disappointment; losing their first three Five Nations matches. However, the tournament ended on a high when Scotland recorded only their second victory over England at Twickenham since 1938. Scotland then went on to draw with the All Blacks 25–25 in the late autumn.

Scotland recovered their form in 1984 and achieved their second Grand Slam, and their first since 1925, under the captaincy of Jim Aitken. The team benefited from consistent selection – 12 players took part in all four Five Nations matches, and of the 20 players used in total throughout only two played for clubs outwith Scotland. Jim Telfer stood down after the Grand Slam to concentrate on his professional career as a school master. He was succeeded by his assistant, the former Hawick fly-half, Colin Telfer (not a relative). He lasted just over a year, enduring a whitewash in the 1985 Five Nations, before resigning to concentrate on his business. Derrick Grant was then appointed head coach.

In January 1986, a trial match between "Blues" (players expected to feature for Scotland) and "Reds" (emerging players with a possible international future) resulted in a shock 41–10 win for the "Reds". The "Reds" team included Gavin and Scott Hastings, Finlay Calder and David Sole, all of whom who would debut for Scotland in the Five Nations that year and feature prominently for the side in the years that followed. Scotland went on to share the 1986 Five Nations championship with France, each side winning three out of their four games. The series also saw Scotland thrash England 33–6 at Murrayfield; Scotland's record win over the English, at the time one point short of Scotland's best score in any rugby union international and England's heaviest defeat in over a century.

=== 1987–2000 ===
Scotland went to the first World Cup, played in New Zealand and Australia in the summer of 1987. John Rutherford, the team's general and controlling influence, had injured his knee on an unauthorised tour of Bermuda. He broke down after less than a quarter of an hour of the first World Cup match against France and never played for Scotland again. Scotland had been in the lead but the match finished level. Scotland lost to New Zealand in the quarter-final. On 27 June 1988, Ian McGeechan was appointed as head coach to succeed Derrick Grant who had retired after the end of the 1988 Five Nations series.

Their greatest year in the modern era was 1990, when their season came down to one game, a Grand Slam decider at Murrayfield against the "auld enemy", England. Both sides had won all their Five Nations fixtures, and England were overwhelming favourites despite being the away side. Scotland under the captaincy of prop David Sole went on to win 13–7, and with it their third Grand Slam. The match against England in 1990 was also only the second time that Flower of Scotland was played at Murrayfield, having become Scotland's pre-match national anthem that year.

SRU made no money from sponsorship after their 1990 Grand Slam as their thistle was not registered. As a result, a new logo – a thistle containing a rugby ball – was designed in October 1990 by graphic designer Chic Harper. This was launched on Thursday 22 November at Murrayfield, Edinburgh with a £1M sponsorship deal with Umbro. The new logo was first worn on the nation's shirts at Parc des Princes, Paris on Saturday 19 January 1991 with the name 'Scottish Rugby Union' below the thistle. This was soon replaced with just 'Scottish Rugby'. In recent times, the wording has been dropped altogether to leave only the thistle as the symbol of the Scottish team.

The second World Cup took place in 1991 with matches shared between the Five Nations. Scotland won their pool, though the game against Ireland was close, and then beat Western Samoa in the quarter-final. They lost to England in the semi-final held at Murrayfield to a Rob Andrew drop goal. In the third place play-off they were beaten by New Zealand. Scotland went through 1994 without a single win, but bounced back in 1995 to win their first three Five Nations matches. This run of wins included a 23–21 win away against France, courtesy of a last minute try and conversion by Gavin Hastings. This was Scotland's first win in Paris since 1969. The last Five Nations match was another Grand Slam decider against England; however, this time the English defeated the Scots 24–12, largely due to the kicking prowess of Rob Andrew.

The third World Cup, held in South Africa, came in 1995. Pool play saw a narrow defeat by France, thanks to an injury-time try, and Scotland finished second in the pool. They were eliminated in the quarter-final against New Zealand. Scotland won the last-ever Five Nations Championship in 1999 with a last minute win by Wales over England. However, in the 1999 World Cup they suffered a quarter-final defeat to New Zealand.

=== 2000–2008 ===
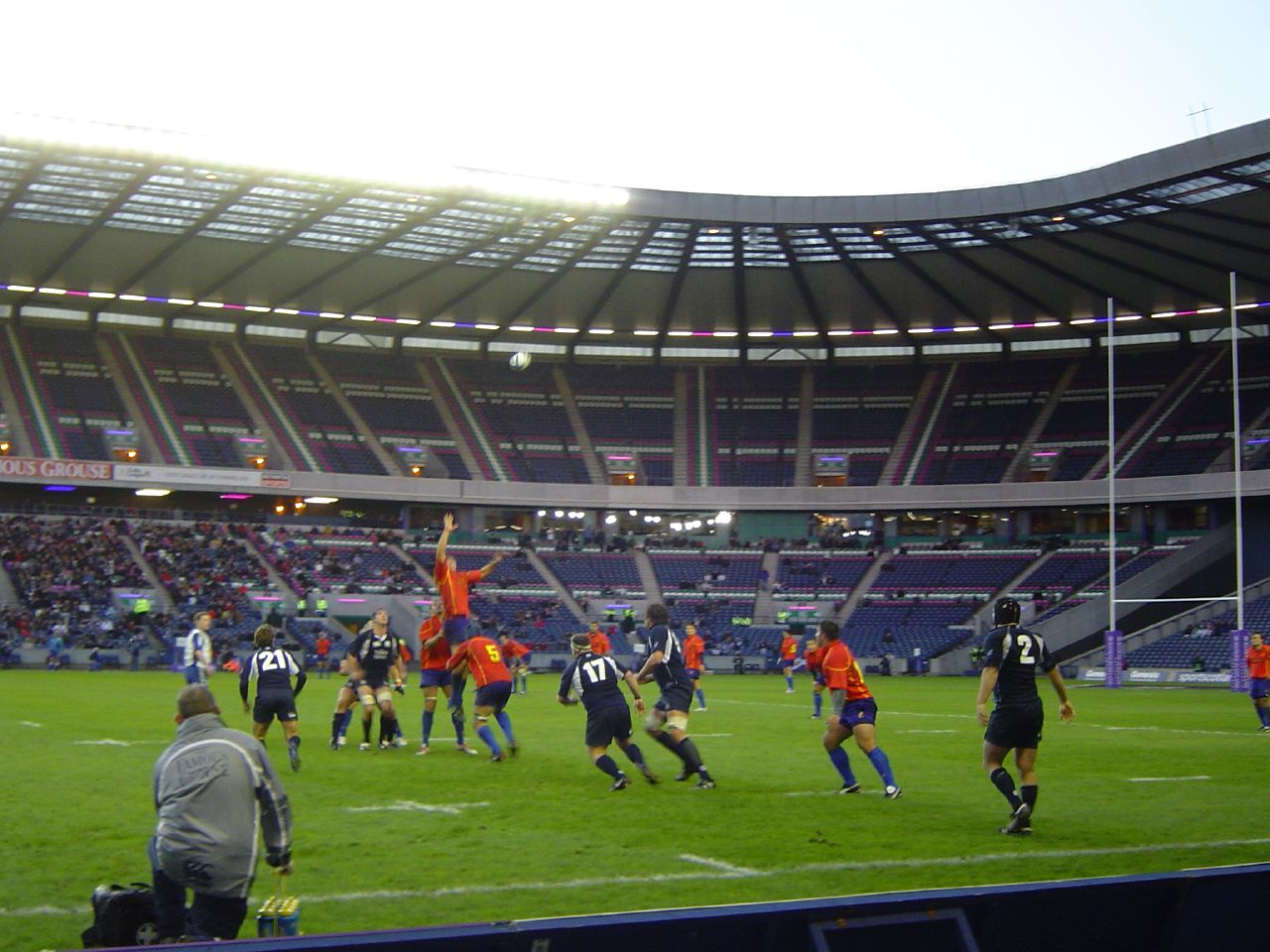
11 November 2006, Scotland 44–6 Romania

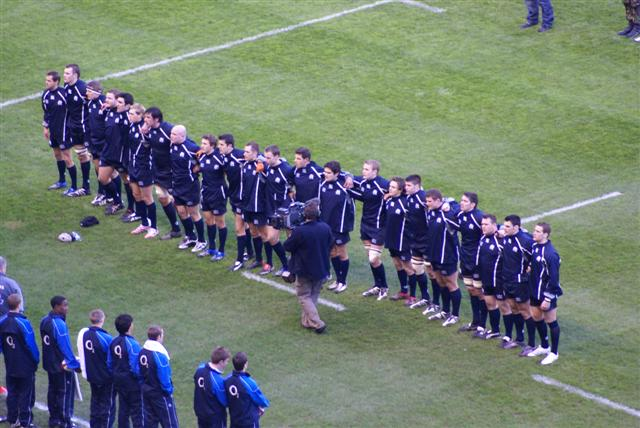
Scotland line–up prior to the 2007 Calcutta Cup

Scotland endured a torrid Six Nations in 2000, losing their first four straight games. but won the final game against England 19–13 under captain Andy Nicol.

Australian coach Matt Williams became the first foreigner to coach Scotland in 2003. However his tenure was both controversial and unsuccessful, marred by a string of poor results and fall-outs with coaches and players. In 2004 Williams attempted to introduce a controversial "Fortress Scotland" policy, whereby only those currently playing in Scotland were eligible to play in the national team. Meanwhile, the Scottish Rugby Union (SRU) came under new management, chief executive Phil Anderton (known as 'Firework Phil' for his pre-match entertainment spectacles) was leading the way back to financial solvency and implementing major reforms to reverse the decline of the game in Scotland, but he resigned in January 2005 after his boss David Mackay was forced to resign by the SRU's general committee. By April 2005, Scotland had won only three out of 17 matches under Williams. Following a review by the SRU and public criticism from several of his players, Williams was finally sacked on 25 April 2005.

Frank Hadden, the head coach of Edinburgh Gunners, was appointed interim coach for the 2005 summer internationals against the Barbarians and Romania, winning both. On 15 September 2005, he was appointed national coach of the Scotland team. In the first match of the 2006 Six Nations campaign, against France, Scotland won 20–16, and this was the first time since 1999 that they had beaten France. Scotland also beat England 18–12 at home at Murrayfield to reclaim the Calcutta Cup.

In the 2006 Autumn internationals Scotland won two of three fixtures. They convincingly beat Romania and put up a solid first half performance against the Pacific Islanders. In the final match against Australia, Scotland failed to impress, with Australia winning 44–15.

In 2007, Scotland became the first Six Nations team to lose at home to Italy, 17–37. This was Italy's biggest ever victory over Scotland, home or away. Later that year, the side travelled to France for the 2007 Rugby World Cup. They made their way through their group and reached the quarter finals, where they were knocked out by Argentina.

Scotland opened their 2008 Six Nations campaign losing 27–6 to France at home. Pressure on Frank Hadden started to intensify after Scotland lost to Wales and then to Ireland. They then defeated England in the Calcutta Cup with a 15–9 victory before succumbing to Italy, avoiding the wooden spoon only on scoring difference. They then toured Argentina in the summer to play two tests against Argentina. They lost the first test 21–15, but won the second 26–14.

=== 2009–present ===
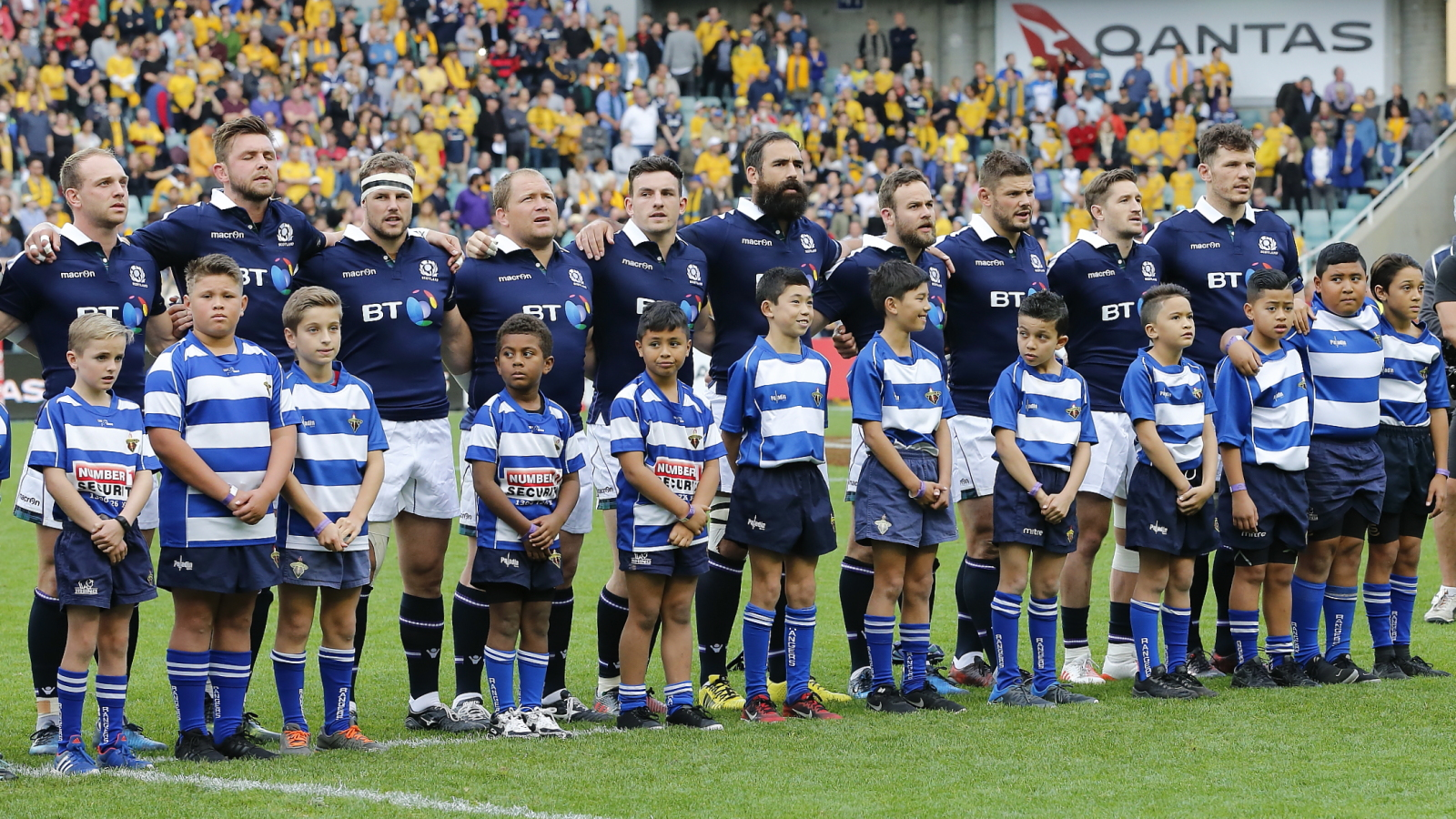
Australia vs Scotland at Allianz Stadium, Sydney, 2017

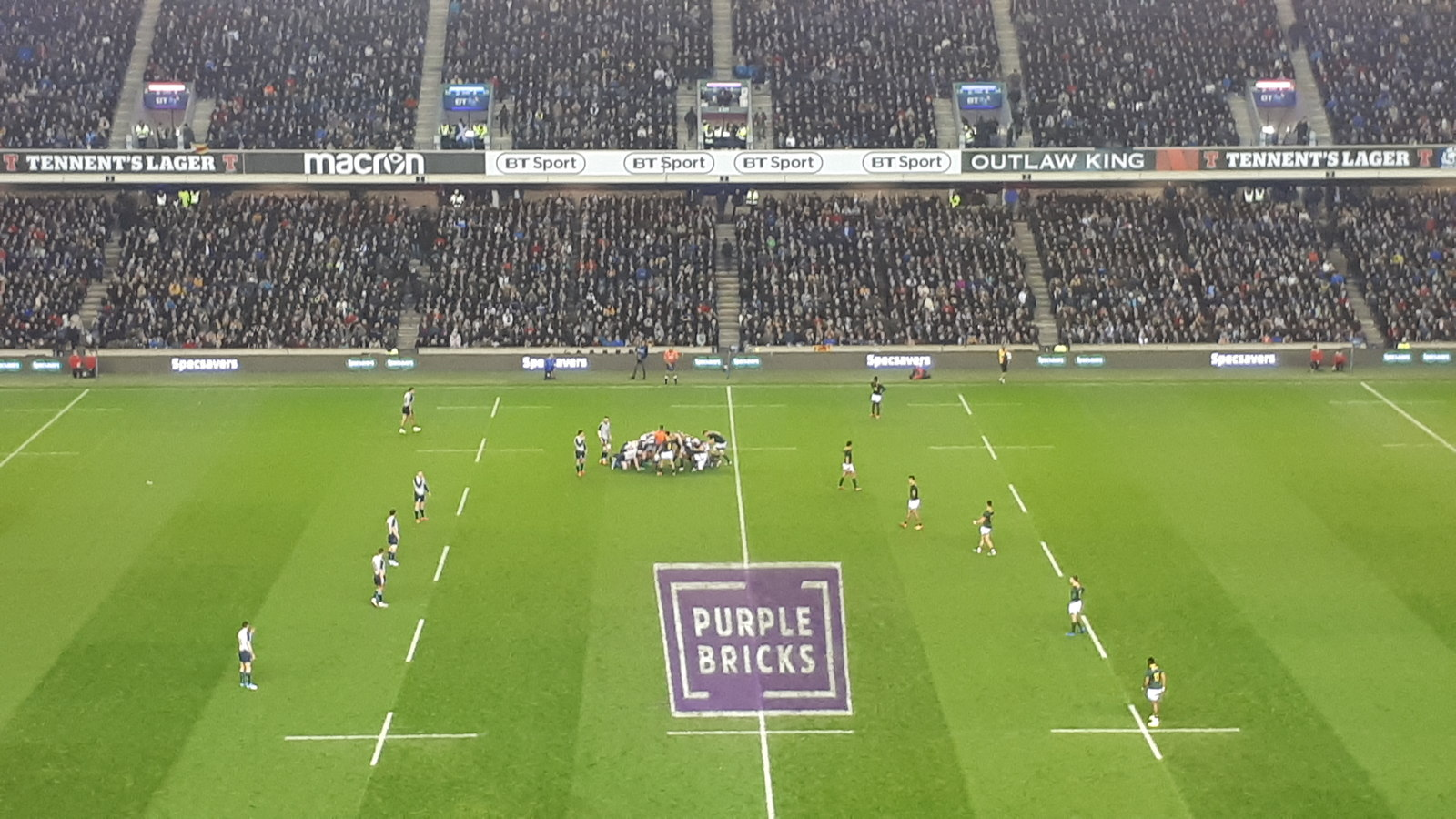
Scotland V. South Africa, Murrayfield Stadium, 2018

In a dismal 2009 Six Nations campaign, Scotland won just one match for a second consecutive year (against Italy) and thus, on 2 April 2009 Frank Hadden resigned as head coach of the national side. On 4 June 2009, ex-England, Edinburgh and Bath coach Andy Robinson was named head coach in time for the 2009 Autumn Internationals. Scotland's form picked up with a 23–10 victory over Fiji and a memorable 9–8 win against Australia (the first win over the Wallabies for 27 years) at Murrayfield. In the 2010 Six Nations Scotland lost against France, Wales and Italy before drawing with England. Against Ireland, in the final rugby match at Croke Park, Scotland gained their only win of the tournament 23–20 with a last-minute penalty by Dan Parks, denying the Irish the Triple Crown and assuring they themselves would avoid the wooden spoon. That summer, Scotland toured Argentina and recorded their first ever away series victory, beating the Pumas in both tests, 24–16 and 13–9. In the Autumn Internationals of 2010, Scotland lost heavily against New Zealand before recording victories against South Africa, 21–17, and Samoa, 19–16. Scotland had a poor showing in the 2011 Six Nations, winning just one match, a 21–8 victory over Italy. In the 2011 Rugby World Cup, Scotland struggled to beat Romania 34–24 and Georgia 15–6, before losing 13–12 to Argentina. Needing a win going into their final match against England in Auckland, they led 12–3 with a quarter of the game to go, only to lose out to a Chris Ashton try, going down 16–12. This was the first time Scotland had been knocked out in the group stages of the Rugby World Cup.

Scotland's performance was weak during the 2012 Six Nations, picking up the wooden spoon and being whitewashed, despite promising moments, and falling to 12th, Scotland's lowest ever in the IRB rankings. Even after this whitewash, Scotland defeated Australia 9–6 in the 2012 Scotland rugby union tour of Australia, Fiji and Samoa. This was Scotland's first win in Australia since 1982 and the first time in 30 years that Scotland defeated Australia more than once in a row. Scotland also recorded away wins over both Fiji and Samoa. During Scotland's 2012 Autumn Tests they suffered a series of defeats, versus the All Blacks, South Africa and most notably Tonga, which caused head coach Andy Robinson to resign. Scott Johnson became interim head coach for the team in December 2012. During the 2013 Six Nations, Scotland won their matches against Italy and Ireland to finish third, their best finish in the competition since 2006. On 3 May 2013, Johnson was named the first ever Director of Rugby for Scotland responsible for overseeing all rugby in the nation. On 27 May 2013, it was announced that Vern Cotter would become head coach of Scotland, but the SRU had to wait until 2014 as club Clermont failed to reach an agreement with the SRU to release Cotter a year early from his contract.

Scotland had a dismal 2014 Six Nations campaign; managing only one win (away in Italy), finishing second bottom and defeated 51–3 by Wales in the final match. Vern Cotter finally assumed his role as head coach, and in June of the same year Scotland won three tests against the top teams of the Americas, before being hammered by South Africa 55–6. The three autumn tests held at Murrayfield during November yielded wins over Argentina and Tonga, and a narrow defeat against New Zealand. The test against Tonga took place at Rugby Park, Kilmarnock, and was the first Rugby Union international to be played on an artificial surface.

The 2015 Six Nations Championship ended in a whitewash for Scotland, despite optimism amongst players and supporters beforehand. However, Scotland displayed improved performances in their World Cup warm-up games over the summer, with two wins over Italy and narrow defeats away in Ireland and France. Scotland played well at the 2015 Rugby World Cup in England; qualifying from their group by beating Japan, USA and Samoa, although they lost to South Africa. Scotland played Australia in the quarter-finals, and with 30 seconds remaining led 34–32. However, referee Craig Joubert then awarded the Wallabies a highly controversial penalty, later judged by the game's ruling body to be incorrect, which Bernard Foley scored to give Australia victory.

Scotland lost their first two games in the 2016 Six Nations Championship, extending their losing streak in the Six Nations to nine matches, their worst run in the championship since the 1950s. The Scots finally ended their losing run with a 36–20 win over Italy in Rome; John Barclay, John Hardie and Tommy Seymour all scoring tries. Scotland followed that win up with a victory over France at Murrayfield; Stuart Hogg, Duncan Taylor and Tim Visser scoring tries in a 29–18 win. It was Scotland's first victory over France since 2006, and also ended a 10 match losing streak against Les Bleus. Scotland had a successful tour of Japan in June (winning both test matches), and during the Autumn Internationals recorded a third consecutive win against Argentina (their seventh recognised win overall against the Pumas).

In the 2017 Six Nations, Scotland saw a marked improvement in performance with three home wins and two away defeats. This was Vern Cotter's last tournament as head coach of Scotland, despite them also beating Australia 24–19 on the summer tour of the Southern Hemisphere. In their first 6Ns game, Scotland went in with confidence to win their first opening match for eleven years against Ireland in a close match at Murrayfield Stadium. This followed with a defeat in Paris to France. Scotland secured a win over Wales in their third game, Scotland's first since 2007. In the eagerly anticipated Calcutta Cup tie against England at Twickenham, however, Scotland were thrashed 61–21. This was a record defeat against the English, and a result which ended their hopes of winning the Six Nations. In the last week, Scotland defeated Italy at Murrayfield with a 29–0 victory, securing fourth place in the tournament table.

Gregor Townsend took over as head coach in June 2017. His first fixture as head coach was against Italy in Singapore where Scotland won 34–13. A week later Scotland defeated Australia 24–19 in Sydney, the second time in a row Scotland had won on Australian soil. The victory was made more notable by the list of absentees, such as Stuart Hogg and Grieg Laidlaw, who were in New Zealand on Lions' duty. The tour was concluded by a 27–22 loss to Fiji in Suva. Victory over Samoa in November 2017 was followed by a breathtaking performance against New Zealand at a sold-out Murrayfield. Tries from Jonny Gray and Huw Jones brought Scotland to 17–22 with barely a minute to go, but it took a superb cover tackle from the All Blacks fly-half Beauden Barrett to prevent Stuart Hogg from scoring a winning try. A week later Scotland registered a record win over the Wallabies, who played with 14 men for the majority of the game after Kepu's dismissal, inflicting eight tries on the visitors in what was the Australian hooker Stephen Moore's final international game. Scotland won 53–24, their biggest ever margin of victory over Australia.

In the 2019 Rugby World Cup, Scotland took an early exit with losses to both Ireland and the hosts. Scotland did however score ninety-five unanswered points across two wins against Samoa and Russia.

On 6 February 2021, Scotland won their first game of that year's Six Nations tournament, defeating England 6 – 11 at Twickenham for the first time since 1983 and securing the Calcutta Cup. On 13 February they lost their next match, against Wales, 25–24 at Murrayfield. In 2024 the Scotland Rugby Men's Team featured in a Netflix documentary Six Nations: Full Contact.

== Thistle and the anthem ==
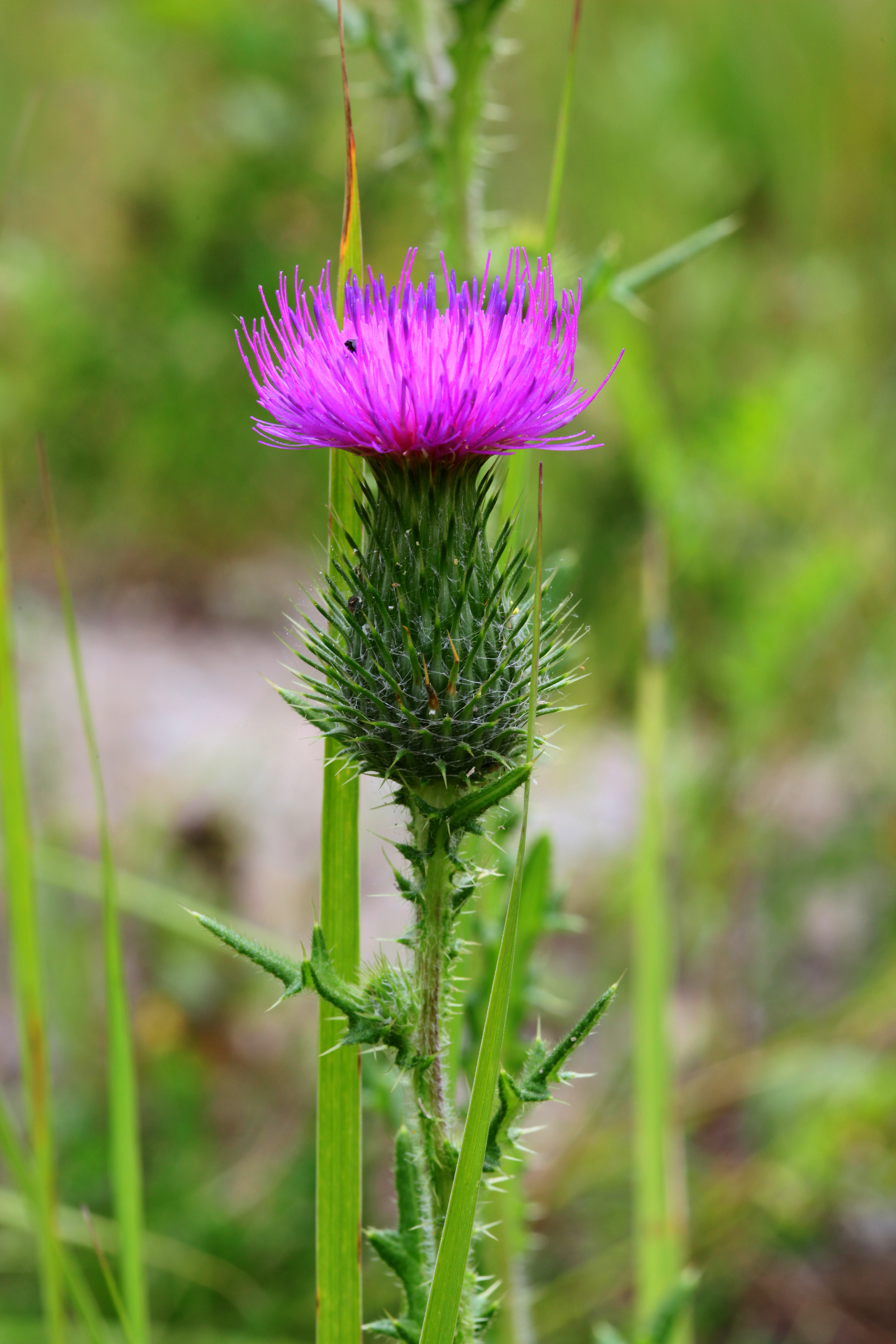
The thistle, the national emblem of Scotland since the reign of Alexander III of Scotland (1249–1286) and the emblem of the Scottish rugby team

The thistle is the national flower, and also the symbol of the Scotland national rugby union team. According to legend the "guardian thistle" has played its part in the defence of Scotland against a night attack by Norwegian Vikings, one of whom let out a yell of pain when he stepped barefoot on a thistle, alerting the Scottish defenders. The Latin motto, Nemo me impune lacessit ("No-one provokes me with impunity!") in English, is an ancient motto of the Kings of Scotland, and also of Scotland's premier chivalric order, the Most Ancient and Most Noble Order of the Thistle, and of the Scots Guards (the latter both "belonging" to the monarch).

"Flower of Scotland" has been used since 1990 as Scotland's unofficial national anthem. It was written by Roy Williamson of The Corries in 1967, and adopted by the SRU to replace "God Save the Queen". In the first year of using "Flower of Scotland" as an anthem, Scotland walked onto the pitch at the beginning of the Five Nations Championship deciding match against England. This combination was explosive and Scotland went on to beat England 13–7 and win the Five Nations Championship with a Grand Slam. Before Flower of Scotland was adopted as the national anthem, "Scotland the Brave" was played for Scotland in the 1987 Rugby World Cup. Said song was usually immediately played before God Save the Queen when Scotland was playing at home (during the entrance of the teams), as result from a decision of the SRU to defuse any possibility of a "national embarrassment" (which the Scottish press feared) caused by the crowd booing the latter anthem, as the Queen was visiting Murrayfield during the 1976 Calcutta Cup.

== Strip ==
Scotland have traditionally worn navy blue jerseys, white shorts and blue socks. On the occasion that Scotland is the home side and the opposing team normally wears dark colours, Scotland will use its change strip. Traditionally this is a white jersey with navy blue shorts and socks. For a brief period, when Cotton Oxford were the shirt sponsors, the white shirt was replaced by a bright orange one with orange and blue hoops on the sleeves. This was first used against the New Zealand Māori on 14 November 1998. This change strip was replaced by the traditional white one just two years later. Also during this sponsorship deal, purple was introduced to the traditional blue jersey. This was a significant departure from the traditional colours of blue and white, although purple is inspired from the thistle flower.

=== Kit manufacturers and shirt sponsors ===
The Scottish Rugby Union made no money from sponsorship after their 1990 Grand Slam as their thistle was not registered. As a result, a new logo – a thistle containing a rugby ball – was designed in October 1990 by graphic designer Chic Harper (www.chicharper.com). This was launched on Thursday 22 November at Murrayfield, Edinburgh with a £1M sponsorship deal with Umbro. The new logo was first worn on the nation's shirts at Parc des Princes, Paris on Saturday 19 January 1991 with the name 'Scottish Rugby Union' below the thistle. This was soon replaced with just 'Scottish Rugby'. In recent times, the wording has been dropped altogether to leave only the thistle as the symbol of the Scottish team. In September 1993, a sponsorship deal was announced with The Famous Grouse, resulting in a sponsors' name being added to Scottish international players' kit for the first time in addition to the jersey manufacturers' emblem. In 1997 a new deal saw the Grouse logo appear on the Scotland jersey. Further deals followed and it became the longest association with a sponsor in world rugby. During this time, when Scotland played test matches in France, The Famous Grouse logo was replaced by the initials "TFG" due to the Evin law that bans any alcohol advertisement (including in sports events) in France. In May 2007, after seventeen years, The Famous Grouse ended its shirt sponsorship with the team. The Famous Grouse did maintain a low profile link to the Scottish Rugby Union by becoming the main spirit sponsor. This deal is thought to be worth a tenth of the original cost and forbids the Scottish Rugby Union from affiliating itself from any other whisky manufacturer.

On 3 September 2007 it was announced that the then Rangers chairman Sir David Murray's company would become the new shirt sponsor, in a deal worth £2.7 million over three years. In August 2011, the Royal Bank of Scotland took over as main sponsors of Scottish Rugby, after Sir David Murray's company decided to end their sponsorship. BT became the primary shirt sponsor as part of the £20 million deal signed in 2014. In the summer of 2021 Peter Vardy Group replaced BT as principal partner and shirt sponsor.

Period	Kit manufacturer	Shirt sponsor
1960s–1994	Umbro	No shirt sponsor
1994–1998	Pringle	The Famous Grouse
1998–2000	Cotton Oxford	The Famous Grouse
2000–2008	Canterbury	The Famous Grouse
2008–2011	Canterbury	Murray
2011–2013	Canterbury	Royal Bank of Scotland
2013–2015	Macron	Royal Bank of Scotland
2015–2021	Macron	BT
2021–2024	Macron	Peter Vardy Group
2024–	Macron	Arnold Clark

== Home stadium ==
Scotland play at Murrayfield Stadium which is the largest sports stadium in Scotland and with a capacity of 67,144 - the fifth largest in the UK. In the early years the Scottish rugby team played at Inverleith in the north of Edinburgh. In 1923 SRU identified 19 acres of land at Murrayfield in the west of the city on which to build a purpose-built stadium, purchasing this from Edinburgh Polo Club. One stand and three embankments were constructed over the following two years with the first international match taking place in 1925 where 70,000 people watched Scotland win 14–11 against England, thereby securing both the championship and a Grand Slam.

The stadium has been developed over the years with the East Stand built in 1983, the new North and South stands in 1993 and a redeveloped West Stand completed in 1994.

Murrayfield's record attendance of 104,000 was set on 1 March 1975 when Scotland defeated Wales 12–10 during the 1975 Five Nations Championship. This attendance stood as a world record until 1999 when 107,042 attended the Bledisloe Cup match between Australia and New Zealand in Stadium Australia.

== Record ==
Men's World Rugby Rankings Top 20 as of 16 November 2026
Rank	Change (Note: Change from the previous week)	Team	Points
1	Steady	South Africa	91.53
2	Steady	New Zealand	90.65
3	▲1	France	89.05
4	▼1	Ireland	88.70
5	Steady	England	86.99
6	Steady	Scotland	85.28
7	Steady	Australia	82.24
8	Steady	Argentina	82.09
9	▲1	Wales	79.37
10	▼1	Fiji	77.79
11	Steady	Italy	75.84
12	Steady	Japan	75.25
13	Steady	Georgia	74.23
14	▲1	United States	68.39
15	▼1	Portugal	68.24
16	▲3	Samoa	67.60
17	▲1	Chile	67.00
18	▼2	Spain	66.53
19	▼2	Tonga	65.58
20	Steady	Uruguay	65.17

Scotland's historical rankings

Source: World Rugby
Graph updated to 16 November 2026

=== Six Nations ===
Scotland competes annually in the Six Nations Championship, which is played against five other European nations: France, England, Ireland, Italy and Wales. The Six Nations started out as the Home Nations Championship in 1883, with Scotland sharing the championship with England in 1886 before winning the title outright for the first time a year later. Scotland have won the title outright 14 times and shared the championship a further eight times. Scotland have won three Grand Slams (including the Triple Crown) in 1925, 1984 and 1990, in addition to a further seven Triple Crowns. They also contest the Calcutta Cup with England as part of the championship. Scotland were the winners of the last Five Nations in 1999, before Italy joined the competition to make it the Six Nations.

==== Trophies within the Six Nations ====
The Triple Crown is awarded to the Scotland, England, Ireland or Wales national side if they can beat the other three 'Home Nation' sides in the Six Nations tournament of that year. Ireland is the current holder.

The Calcutta Cup is awarded to the winner of the Scotland – England match in the Six Nations tournament. Scotland is the current holder.

The Centenary Quaich is awarded to the winner of the Scotland – Ireland match in the Six Nations tournament. Ireland is the current holder.

The Auld Alliance Trophy is awarded to the winner of the Scotland – France match in the Six Nations tournament. Scotland is the current holder.

The Doddie Weir Cup is awarded to the winner of the Scotland – Wales match in the Six Nations tournament. Scotland is the current holder.

The Cuttitta Cup is awarded to the winner of the Scotland – Italy match in the Six Nations tournament. Italy is the current holder.

Beating all the sides in the Six Nations is called a Grand Slam but this has no trophy.

	England	France	Ireland	Italy	Scotland	Wales
Tournaments	130	97	132	27	132	132
Outright wins (shared wins)
Home Nations	5 (4)	—N/a	4 (3)	—N/a	9 (2)	7 (3)
Five Nations	17 (6)	12 (8)	6 (5)	—N/a	5 (6)	15 (8)
Six Nations	7	8	6	0	0	6
Overall	29 (10)	20 (8)	16 (8)	0 (0)	14 (8)	28 (11)
Grand Slams
Home Nations	—N/a	—N/a	—N/a	—N/a	—N/a	2
Five Nations	11	6	1	—N/a	3	6
Six Nations	2	4	3	0	0	4
Overall	13	10	4	0	3	12
Triple Crowns
Home Nations	5	—N/a	2	—N/a	7	6
Five Nations	16	—N/a	4	—N/a	3	11
Six Nations	5	—N/a	9	—N/a	0	5
Overall	26	—N/a	15	—N/a	10	22
Wooden Spoons
Home Nations	7	—N/a	10	—N/a	5	6
Five Nations	10	12	15	—N/a	15	10
Six Nations	0	1	0	18	4	4
Overall	17	13	25	18	24	20

=== Individual trophies ===
The Hopetoun Cup is awarded to the winner of Scotland – Australia test matches. Scotland is the current holder.

The Douglas Horn Trophy is awarded to the winner of Scotland – Canada test matches. Scotland is the current holder.

=== Test Series Victories ===
Argentina - 2010

Japan - 2016

Fiji - 2012, 1993

Samoa - 2012, 2004

Tonga - 1993

United States - 2014

Canada - 2014

Zimbabwe - 1995, 1988

Scotland have previously played one or more series against these nations but have never won an overall test series against them:

New Zealand

South Africa

Australia

=== Rugby World Cup ===
Rugby World Cup record									Qualification						
Year	Round	Pld	W	D	L	PF	PA	Squad	Pos	Pld	W	D	L	PF	PA
(New Zealand) (Australia) 1987	Quarter-finals	4	2	1	1	138	99	Squad	Invited						
(England) (France) (Ireland) (Scotland) (Wales) 1991	Fourth place	6	4	0	2	162	64	Squad	Automatically qualified						
(South Africa) 1995	Quarter-finals	4	2	0	2	179	75	Squad	Automatically qualified						
(Wales) 1999	Quarter-finals	5	3	0	2	173	108	Squad	1st	2	2	0	0	170	14
(Australia) 2003	Quarter-finals	5	3	0	2	118	130	Squad	Automatically qualified						
(France) 2007	Quarter-finals	5	3	0	2	129	85	Squad	Automatically qualified						
(New Zealand) 2011	Pool stage	4	2	0	2	73	59	Squad	Automatically qualified						
(England) 2015	Quarter-finals	5	3	0	2	170	128	Squad	Automatically qualified						
(Japan) 2019	Pool stage	4	2	0	2	119	55	Squad	Automatically qualified						
(France) 2023	Pool stage	4	2	0	2	146	71	Squad	Automatically qualified						
(Australia) 2027	Qualified								Automatically qualified						
(United States) 2031	To be determined								To be determined						
Total	—	46	26	1	19	1407	874	—	—	2	2	0	0	170	14
Champions; Runners–up; Third place; Fourth place; Home venue

Scotland has competed in every Rugby World Cup since the inaugural tournament in 1987. Their best finish was fourth in 1991. In their semi-final on 26 October 1991 Scotland lost 6–9 to England at Murrayfield after Gavin Hastings missed a penalty almost in front of and a short distance from the posts. On 30 October Scotland lost the third-place play-off to New Zealand in Cardiff 13–6. Since then they have qualified for the quarter-finals in all but three occasions, in 2011, 2019 and 2023. In 2015, they came within 30 seconds of a famous win over Australia; however, a last minute penalty sealed the win for the Wallabies.

World Cup results
Year	Stage	Team	Score	Team	Venue
1987	Pool 4	France	20–20	Scotland	Lancaster Park
1987	Pool 4	Scotland	60–21	Zimbabwe	Athletic Park
1987	Pool 4	Romania	28–55	Scotland	Carisbrook
1987	Quarter-final	New Zealand	30–3	Scotland	Lancaster Park
1991	Pool B	Scotland	47–9	Japan	Murrayfield
1991	Pool B	Scotland	51–12	Zimbabwe	Murrayfield
1991	Pool B	Scotland	24–15	Ireland	Murrayfield
1991	Quarter-final	Scotland	28–6	Western Samoa	Murrayfield
1991	Semi-final	Scotland	6–9	England	Murrayfield
1991	Third-place play-off	Scotland	6–13	New Zealand	Cardiff
1995	Pool D	Ivory Coast	0–89	Scotland	Rustenburg
1995	Pool D	Scotland	41–5	Tonga	Pretoria
1995	Pool D	France	22–19	Scotland	Pretoria
1995	Quarter-final	New Zealand	48–30	Scotland	Pretoria
1999	Pool 1	Scotland	29–46	South Africa	Murrayfield
1999	Pool 1	Scotland	43–12	Uruguay	Murrayfield
1999	Pool 1	Scotland	48–0	Spain	Murrayfield
1999	Quarter-final play-off	Scotland	35–20	Samoa	Murrayfield
1999	Quarter-final	Scotland	18–30	New Zealand	Murrayfield
2003	Pool B	Scotland	32–11	Japan	Townsville
2003	Pool B	Scotland	39–15	United States	Brisbane
2003	Pool B	France	51–9	Scotland	Sydney
2003	Pool B	Scotland	22–20	Fiji	Aussie Stadium
2003	Quarter-final	Australia	33–16	Scotland	Brisbane
2007	Pool C	Scotland	56–10	Portugal	Saint-Étienne
2007	Pool C	Scotland	42–0	Romania	Murrayfield
2007	Pool C	Scotland	0–40	New Zealand	Murrayfield
2007	Pool C	Scotland	18–16	Italy	Saint-Étienne
2007	Quarter-final	Argentina	19–13	Scotland	Stade de France
2011	Pool B	Scotland	34–24	Romania	Invercargill
2011	Pool B	Scotland	15–6	Georgia	Invercargill
2011	Pool B	Argentina	13–12	Scotland	Wellington
2011	Pool B	England	16–12	Scotland	Auckland
2015	Pool B	Scotland	45–10	Japan	Kingsholm, Gloucester
2015	Pool B	Scotland	39–16	United States	Elland Road, Leeds
2015	Pool B	South Africa	34–16	Scotland	St James' Park, Newcastle
2015	Pool B	Samoa	33–36	Scotland	St James' Park, Newcastle
2015	Quarter-final	Australia	35–34	Scotland	Twickenham
2019	Pool A	Ireland	27–3	Scotland	Yokohama
2019	Pool A	Scotland	34–0	Samoa	Kobe
2019	Pool A	Scotland	61–0	Russia	Fukuroi
2019	Pool A	Japan	28–21	Scotland	Yokohama
2023	Pool B	South Africa	18–3	Scotland	Marseille
2023	Pool B	Scotland	45–17	Tonga	Nice
2023	Pool B	Scotland	84–0	Romania	Villeneuve d'Ascq
2023	Pool B	Ireland	36–14	Scotland	Saint-Denis

=== Overall ===
Scotland achieved 100 points for the first time in defeating a Japan side 100–8 on 13 November 2004. The previous record had been 89–0 against Côte d'Ivoire (Ivory Coast) in the first round of Rugby World Cup 1995. The game versus Japan was played at the home of St Johnstone F.C., McDiarmid Park, Perth. It was the first time that Scotland had ever played "North of the Forth" (i.e. the Firth of Forth) in the Caledonian region. In the same game Chris Paterson moved ahead of Andy Irvine in the list of Scotland's all-time points scorers.

Below is a table of the representative rugby matches played by a Scotland national XV at test level up until 15 November 2026.

Opponent	Played	Won	Lost	Drawn	Win%	For	Aga	Diff
Argentina	24	12	12	0	50%	587	474	+113
Australia	36	14	22	0	39%	535	826	−291
Canada	6	5	1	0	83%	226	71	+155
Chile	1	1	0	0	100%	52	11	+41
England	144	48	77	19	33%	1,367	1,790	−423
Fiji	12	9	3	0	75%	390	264	+126
France	104	40	61	3	39%	1,422	1,677	−255
Georgia	6	6	0	0	100%	219	54	+165
Ireland	144	66	73	5	46%	1,561	1,827	−266
Italy	39	29	10	0	74%	1,005	659	+346
Ivory Coast	1	1	0	0	100%	89	0	+89
Japan	9	8	1	0	89%	363	132	+231
New Zealand	34	0	32	2	0%	410	1021	−611
Pacific Islanders	1	1	0	0	100%	34	22	+12
Portugal	2	2	0	0	100%	115	31	+84
Presidents XV	1	1	0	0	100%	27	16	+11
Romania	14	12	2	0	86%	559	192	+367
Russia	1	1	0	0	100%	61	0	+61
Samoa	13	11	1	1	85%	373	205	+168
South Africa	31	5	26	0	16%	367	834	−467
Spain	1	1	0	0	100%	48	0	+48
Tonga	7	6	1	0	86%	297	89	+208
United States	8	7	1	0	88%	376	103	+273
Uruguay	2	2	0	0	100%	74	31	+43
Wales	132	54	75	3	41%	1,496	1,863	−367
Zimbabwe	2	2	0	0	100%	111	33	+78
Total	775	344	398	33	44.38%	12,164	12,225	−61

== Players ==
=== Current squad ===
On 26 Oct, Scotland named a 37-player squad ahead of the 2026 Nations Championship Southern Hemisphere Series.

- Caps updated: 14 November 2026 (after Scotland v Australia)

Head coach: (Scotland) Gregor Townsend

Player	Position	Date of birth (age)	Caps	Club/province
Ewan Ashman	Hooker	3 April 2000 (age 26)	39	(Scotland) Edinburgh
Gregor Hiddleston	Hooker	26 March 2002 (age 24)	5	(Scotland) Glasgow Warriors
Seb Stephen	Hooker	29 August 2005 (age 21)	1	(Scotland) Glasgow Warriors
Zander Fagerson	Prop	19 January 1996 (age 30)	86	(Scotland) Glasgow Warriors
Will Hurd	Prop	29 June 1999 (age 27)	13	(England) Leicester Tigers
Nathan McBeth	Prop	8 June 1998 (age 28)	8	(Scotland) Glasgow Warriors
Elliot Millar-Mills	Prop	8 July 1992 (age 34)	15	(England) Newcastle Red Bulls
Pierre Schoeman	Prop	7 May 1994 (age 32)	54	(Scotland) Edinburgh
Rory Sutherland	Prop	24 August 1992 (age 34)	53	(Scotland) Glasgow Warriors
Gregor Brown	Lock	1 July 2001 (age 25)	21	(Scotland) Glasgow Warriors
Scott Cummings	Lock	3 December 1996 (age 29)	54	(Scotland) Glasgow Warriors
Jonny Gray	Lock	14 March 1994 (age 32)	83	(France) Perpignan
Max Williamson	Lock	5 August 2002 (age 24)	17	(Scotland) Glasgow Warriors
Josh Bayliss	Back row	18 September 1997 (age 29)	20	(England) Bath
Rory Darge	Back row	23 February 2000 (age 26)	43	(Scotland) Glasgow Warriors
Jack Dempsey	Back row	12 April 1994 (age 32)	37	(Japan) Toshiba Brave Lupus
Matt Fagerson	Back row	16 July 1998 (age 28)	68	(Scotland) Glasgow Warriors
Ollie Leatherbarrow	Back row	8 April 2002 (age 24)	1	(England) Newcastle Red Bulls
Liam McConnell	Back row	24 June 2004 (age 22)	2	(Scotland) Edinburgh
Jamie Ritchie	Back row	16 August 1996 (age 30)	63	(Scotland) Glasgow Warriors
Jamie Dobie	Scrum-half	7 June 2001 (age 25)	24	(Scotland) Glasgow Warriors
George Horne	Scrum-half	12 May 1995 (age 31)	48	(Scotland) Glasgow Warriors
Ben White	Scrum-half	27 May 1998 (age 28)	40	(France) Toulon
Fergus Burke	Fly-half	3 September 1999 (age 27)	5	(England) Saracens
Finn Russell	Fly-half	23 September 1992 (age 34)	97	(England) Bath
Rory Hutchinson	Centre	29 January 1996 (age 30)	13	(England) Northampton Saints
Huw Jones	Centre	17 December 1993 (age 32)	65	(France) Toulon
Tom Jordan	Centre	18 September 1998 (age 28)	22	(England) Bristol Bears
Stafford McDowall	Centre	24 February 1998 (age 28)	19	(Scotland) Glasgow Warriors
Sione Tuipulotu (c)	Centre	12 February 1997 (age 29)	42	(Scotland) Glasgow Warriors
Darcy Graham	Wing	21 June 1997 (age 29)	58	(Scotland) Edinburgh
Kyle Rowe	Wing	8 February 1998 (age 28)	21	(Scotland) Glasgow Warriors
Kyle Steyn	Wing	29 January 1994 (age 32)	37	(Scotland) Glasgow Warriors
Duhan van der Merwe	Wing	4 June 1995 (age 31)	54	(Scotland) Edinburgh
Ollie Smith	Fullback	7 August 2000 (age 26)	13	(Scotland) Glasgow Warriors
Blair Kinghorn	Fullback	18 January 1997 (age 29)	67	(France) Toulouse

=== Halls of Fame ===
Four former Scotland players have been inducted into the International Rugby Hall of Fame:

- Gordon Brown, inducted 2001
- Gavin Hastings, captain of the British Lions, full back, inducted 2003
- Andy Irvine, full back, Scottish captain and British Lion, inducted 1999
- Ian McGeechan, inducted 2005

Nine former Scotland players have been inducted into the World Rugby Hall of Fame:

- Gordon Brown
- David Bedell-Sivright
- Jim Greenwood
- Gavin Hastings
- Andy Irvine
- Bill Maclagan
- George Macpherson
- Ian McGeechan
- Jim Telfer

Twenty-three former Scotland players have been inducted into the Scottish Rugby Hall of Fame:

- Gary Armstrong
- Gordon Brown
- David Bedell-Sivright
- Finlay Calder
- Sandy Carmichael
- Douglas Elliot
- Jim Greenwood
- Ken Scotland
- Gavin Hastings
- Andy Irvine
- David Leslie
- Bill Maclagan
- George Macpherson
- Norman Mair
- Ian McGeechan
- Mark Morrison
- Hugh McLeod
- Ian McLauchlan
- Chris Paterson
- Jim Renwick
- James Robson (team doctor)
- John Rutherford
- Ian Smith
- Jim Telfer

=== Award winners ===
==== World Rugby Awards ====
The following Scotland players have been recognised at the World Rugby Awards since 2001:

World Rugby Player of the Year
Year	Nominees	Winners
2008	Mike Blair	—
2015	Greig Laidlaw	—

World Rugby Breakthrough Player of the Year
Year	Nominees	Winners
2015	Mark Bennett	—

World Rugby Dream Team of the Year
Year	No.	Players
2021	15.	Stuart Hogg
2025	13.	Huw Jones

World Rugby Try of the Year
Year	Date	Scorer	Match	Tournament	Ref
2023	4 February	Duhan van der Merwe	vs. England	Six Nations	

==== Six Nations Player of the Championship ====
The following Scotland players have been shortlisted for the Six Nations Player of the Championship since 2004:

Six Nations Player of the Year (2004–07)
Year	Nominees	Winners
2004	Scott Murray	—
2004	Simon Taylor	—
2004	Jason White	—
2005	Sean Lamont	—
2005	Chris Paterson	—
2005	Jason White (2)	—
2006	Hugo Southwell	—
2006	Jason White (3)	—
2007	Sean Lamont (2)	—

Six Nations Player of the Year (2008–16)
Year	Nominees	Winners
2008	Mike Blair	—
2012	David Denton	—
2012	Ross Rennie	—
2013	Stuart Hogg	—
2014	David Denton (2)	—
2015	Jonny Gray	—
2015	Stuart Hogg (2)	—
2016	Stuart Hogg (3)	Stuart Hogg
2016	Duncan Taylor	Stuart Hogg

Six Nations Player of the Year (2017–26)
Year	Nominees	Winners
2017	Stuart Hogg (4)	Stuart Hogg (2)
2017	Finn Russell	Stuart Hogg (2)
2021	Hamish Watson	Hamish Watson
2024	Duhan van der Merwe	—
2025	Blair Kinghorn	—
2026	Kyle Steyn	—

Six Nations Team of the Championship
Year	1st XV				2nd XV			
Year	Forwards		Backs		Forwards		Backs	
Year	No.	Players	No.	Players	No.	Players	No.	Players
2021	7.	Hamish Watson	11.	Duhan van der Merwe	Not awarded			
2021	7.	Hamish Watson	15.	Stuart Hogg	Not awarded			
2022	—				Not awarded			
2023	—		12.	Sione Tuipulotu	1.	Pierre Schoeman	10.	Finn Russell
2023	—		13.	Huw Jones	6.	Jamie Ritchie	11.	Duhan van der Merwe
2024	—		10.	Finn Russell	Not awarded			
2024	—		14.	Duhan van der Merwe (2)	Not awarded			
2025	—		13.	Huw Jones (2)	Not awarded			
2025	—		15.	Blair Kinghorn	Not awarded			

Six Nations Try of the Championship
Year	Nominee	Match	Winner	Ref
2023	Duhan van der Merwe (1st try)	vs. England	Duhan van der Merwe	
2024	Duhan van der Merwe (2nd try)	vs. England	—	
2025	Huw Jones	vs. England	—	

== Coaches ==
Before 1971, there was no appointed coach of the Scotland team, the role being assumed by the captain. In 1971, the SRU appointed the first coach as "adviser to the captain". He was Bill Dickinson, a lecturer at Jordanhill College, and his contribution to Scottish rugby in the 1970s was immense. Nairn McEwan took the reins in 1977 for three years before the team was led by Jim Telfer in 1980. Colin Telfer took over for a year before being succeeded by Derrick Grant in the autumn of 1985. From 1988 onwards, Scotland was coached by Jim Telfer, Richie Dixon or Ian McGeechan until 2003 when the Australian Matt Williams was appointed, becoming the first non-Scot to coach the national side. Scotland have appointed a further three non-Scottish coaches to lead the national side, the others being Scott Johnson, an Australian, Andy Robinson, an Englishman, and Vern Cotter from New Zealand.

Robinson took the reins in 2009 after Frank Hadden stepped down. Robinson was no stranger to Scottish rugby as, like his predecessor Hadden, had been the head coach of Edinburgh Rugby and joint coach of Scotland A before being promoted head coach of the national side. Scott Johnson was Robinson's assistant coach when Robinson stood down in 2013, which ended in the result of Johnson being announced as interim head coach for Scotland in 2013, taking the team through the 2013 Six Nations Championship and the 2013 South African Quadrangular Tournament. Vern Cotter was announced as Scottish Head coach but would not take up on the role until June 2014 as he had one year left on his contract with Clermont Auvergne. This meant that Scott Johnson would remain as Interim Coach until the end of that year's Six Nations Championship.

In August 2016 it was announced that Gregor Townsend would replace Vern Cotter as Scotland head coach in June 2017 when his contract expired.

Scottish Rugby coaches by year
Name	Tenure	Tests	Won	Drew	Lost	Win %
(Scotland) Bill Dickinson	1971–1977	27	14	0	13	51.85
(Scotland) Nairn McEwan	1977–1980	14	1	2	11	7.14
(Scotland) Jim Telfer	1980–1984	27	13	2	12	48.15
(Scotland) Colin Telfer	1984–1985	6	0	0	6	0.00
(Scotland) Derrick Grant	1985–1988	18	9	1	8	50.00
(Scotland) Ian McGeechan	1988–1993	33	19	1	13	57.58
(Scotland) Jim Telfer	1993–1995	18	7	1	10	38.9
(Scotland) Richie Dixon	1995–1998	16	5	1	10	31.3
(Scotland) Jim Telfer	1998–1999	20	9	0	11	45
(Scotland) Ian McGeechan	2000–2003	43	18	1	24	41.86
(Australia) Matt Williams	2003–2005	17	3	0	14	17.65
(Scotland) Frank Hadden	2005–2009	41	16	0	25	39.02
(England) Andy Robinson	2009–2012	35	15	1	19	42.86
(Australia) Scott Johnson (interim)	2012–2014	16	5	0	11	31.25
(New Zealand) Vern Cotter	2014–2017	36	19	0	17	52.78
(Scotland) Gregor Townsend	2017–	106	61	1	44	57.55
*Correct as of 18 July 2026

Scottish Rugby coaches totals
Name	Tests	Won	Drew	Lost	Win %
(Scotland) Gregor Townsend	106	61	1	44	57.55
(Scotland) Ian McGeechan	76	37	2	37	48.68
(Scotland) Jim Telfer	65	29	3	33	44.62
(New Zealand) Vern Cotter	36	19	0	17	52.78
(Scotland) Frank Hadden	41	16	0	25	39.02
(England) Andy Robinson	35	15	1	19	42.86
(Scotland) Bill Dickinson	27	14	0	13	51.85
(Scotland) Derrick Grant	18	9	1	8	50.00
(Australia) Matt Williams	17	3	0	14	17.65
(Scotland) Richie Dixon	16	5	1	10	31.3
(Australia) Scott Johnson (interim)	16	5	0	11	31.25
(Scotland) Nairn McEwan	14	1	2	11	7.14
(Scotland) Colin Telfer	6	0	0	6	0.00
*Correct as of 18 July 2026

=== Current coaching staff ===
The current Scottish coaching set up:

Position	Name
Head coach	(Scotland) Gregor Townsend
Assistant coach (forwards coach)	(Scotland) John Dalziel
Assistant coach (skills coach)	(Scotland) Peter Horne
Scrum coach	(France) Pieter De Villiers
Defence coach	(England) Lee Radford
Attack coach	(New Zealand) Brad Mooar
Strength and conditioning coach	(Scotland) Stuart Yule

== Player records ==
=== Most caps ===
Updated 21 November 2026

#	Name	Years	Caps	Position
1	Ross Ford	2004–2017	110	Hooker
2	Chris Paterson	1999–2011	109	Full-back
3	Sean Lamont	2004–2016	105	Wing
4	Stuart Hogg	2012–2023	100	Full-back
5	Finn Russell	2014–	97	Fly-half
6	Zander Fagerson	2016-	87	Prop
6	Grant Gilchrist	2013–	87	Lock
6	Scott Murray	1997–2007	87	Lock
9	Mike Blair	2002–2012	85	Scrum-half
10	Jonny Gray	2013–	84	Lock

=== Most points ===
Updated 21 November 2026

#	Name	Career	Points	Caps	Position
1	Chris Paterson	1999–2011	809	109	Full-back
2	Greig Laidlaw	2010–2019	714	76	Scrum-half
3	Gavin Hastings	1986–1995	667	61	Full-back
4	Finn Russell	2014–	524	97	Fly-half
5	Andy Irvine	1972–1982	269	51	Full-back
6	Dan Parks	2004–2012	266	67	Fly-half
7	Kenny Logan	1992–2003	220	70	Wing
8	Peter Dods	1983–1991	210	23	Full-back
9	Darcy Graham	2018–	205	59	Wing
10	Duhan van der Merwe	2020-	175	54	Wing

=== Most tries ===
Updated 21 November 2026

#	Name	Career	Tries	Caps	Position
1	Darcy Graham	2018–	41	59	Wing
2	Duhan van der Merwe	2020–	35	54	Wing
3	Stuart Hogg	2012–2023	27	100	Full-back
4	Huw Jones	2016–	25	65	Centre
5	Ian Smith	1924–1933	24	32	Wing
5	Tony Stanger	1989–1998	24	58	Wing
7	Chris Paterson	1999–2011	22	109	Full-back
8	Tommy Seymour	2013–2019	20	55	Wing
9	Kyle Steyn	2020-	18	37	Wing
10	Gavin Hastings	1986–1995	17	61	Full-back
10	Alan Tait	1987–1999	17	27	Centre
10	Gregor Townsend	1993–2003	17	82	Fly-half

== See also ==
- List of Scotland national rugby union players
- List of Scotland national rugby union team records

=== Men's national teams ===
==== Senior ====
- Scotland national rugby union team
- Scotland A national rugby union team
- Scotland national rugby sevens team

==== Development ====
- Scotland B national rugby union team
- Scotland Club XV
- Emerging Scotland

==== Age grades ====
- Scotland national under-21 rugby union team
- Scotland national under-20 rugby union team
- Scotland national under-19 rugby union team
- Scotland national under-18 rugby union team
- Scotland national under-17 rugby union team
- Scotland national under-16 rugby union team

=== Women's national teams ===
- Scotland women's national rugby union team
- Scotland women's national rugby sevens team
