= 1937–38 Scottish Districts season =

Rugby union competition

- Countries: Scotland
- Date: 1937–38
- Matches played: 7

The 1937–38 Scottish Districts season is a record of all the rugby union matches for Scotland's district teams.

== History ==
Glasgow District beat Edinburgh District in the Inter-City match.

The North of Scotland District versus Midlands District match is interesting because it involves the use of a substitution. North's fly-half Brander took a head injury in the second half of the match and was replaced by T. A. Findlay of Gordonians.

== Results ==
Date	Try	Conversion	Penalty	Dropped goal	Goal from mark	Notes
1905–1947	3 points	2 points	3 points	4 points	3 points	

=== Inter-City ===
4 December 1937

Glasgow District	29 – 6	Edinburgh District
Try: Archibald Drummond; T.R. Graham; I. Wilkie; Robert Wilson Shaw; Con: Robert Wilson Shaw x 2 Archibald Drummond x 2 Pen: Archibald Drummond x 3	Report	Try: T. C. Brown; Pen: E. C. Hunter

Old Anniesland
Attendance: 5,000
Referee: D. W. Robinson (Glasgow Academicals)

Glasgow District: A. H. Piper (West of Scotland), Archibald Drummond (Kelvinside Academicals), George Crerar (Glasgow Academicals), Ian Shaw (Glasgow HSFP), R. A. Clement (Glasgow Academicals), Robert Wilson Shaw (Glasgow HSFP), I. E. Dawson (Hillhead HSFP), R.C. Graham (Hillhead HSFP), I. Wilkie (Hillhead HSFP), I. M. Sloan (Kelvinside Academicals), Vivian Weston (Kelvinside Academicals), H.C. Kennedy (Glasgow HSFP), I. Mackay (Glasgow HSFP), W. R. Simpson (Glasgow HSFP), T. R. Graham (Hutchesons' GSFP)
Edinburgh District: George Roberts (Watsonians), G. H. Caithness (Edinburgh City Police), T. C. Brown (Watsonians), E. C. Hunter (Watsonians), J. B. Greig (Heriots), I. G. P. Thomson (Melville College F.P.), J. L. McInnes (Boroughmuir), Jake Borthwick (Stewart's College F.P.), Peter Tait (Royal HSFP), R. Bisset (Royal HSFP), D. K. A. MacKenzie (Edinburgh Wanderers), J. Craig (Stewart's College F.P.), D. Robertson (Watsonians), H. A. W. Miller (Heriots), G. C. Brown (Heriots)

=== Other Scottish matches ===
6 November 1937

North of Scotland District	3 - 8	Midlands District
Try: R. B. Thomson	Report	Try: R. Robertson; N. A. Gillanders; Con: C. Armour

St. Machar, Aberdeen
Referee: H. P. Mather (Stewart's College F.P.)

North of Scotland District: J. A. Innes (Aberdeen GSFP), D. Campbell (Gordonians), H. W. Booth (Aberdeen University), J. A. K. Hunter (Gordonians), R. B. Thomson (Gordonians), J. J. Wright (Moray), D. A. G. Brander (Aberdeen GSFP), W. J. D. Anderson (Gordonians), H. Craig (Aberdeenshire), J. C. Cursiter (Moray), G. G. B. Gunn (Gordonians), J. W. Hall (Highland), W. S. Milne (Gordonians), I. McKenzie (Highland), G. A. Rowton (Aberdeen GSFP) - T. A. Findlay (Gordonians) replaced Brander after a head injury.
Midlands District: J. Paterson (Alloa), R. Robertson (St Andrews University), W. N. Louden (St Andrews University), A. I. Abbott (Panmure), and N. A. Gillanders (Panmure), A. H. M. Heap (St Andrews University) and E. R. Winton (St Andrews University), C. Armour (St Andrews University), A. Clark (Perth Academicals), Maurice Henderson (Dunfermline), J. G. Kerr (St Andrews University), G. Mitchell (Dunfermline), J. Ness (Dunfermline), G. Officer (Montrose), and J Stewart (Cupar).

20 November 1937

North of Scotland District	17 - 9	South of Scotland District
Try: R. B. Thomson; Duncan Macrae; Maurice Henderson; Con: C. Armour x 2 Drop: J. A. Innes	Report; Report; Report	Try: J. Beattie; A. I. Dickie; Tom Dorward

Perth
Referee: R. A. Beattie (Watsonians)

North of Scotland District: J. A. Innes (Aberdeen GSFP), N. A. Gillanders (Panmure), A. I. Abbot (Panmure), Duncan Macrae (St. Andrews University), R. B. Thomson (Gordonians), R. S. Lind (Dunfermline), E. R. Winton (St. Andrews University), J. W. Hall (Highland), I. McKenzie (Highland), W. S. Milne (Gordonians), J. R. Ness (Dunfermline), Maurice Henderson (Dunfermline), G. Mitchell (Dunfermline), G. Officer (Montrose), C. Armour (St. Andrews University)
South of Scotland District: J. Dun (Gala), A. I. Dickie (Gala), W. W. Bookless (Gala), C. W. Drummond (Melrose), J. Edwards (Selkirk), G. A. D. Lamb (Melrose), Tom Dorward (Gala), R. Cowe (Melrose), A. Stewart (Selkirk), R. G. Nicholson (Gala), Jock Beattie (Hawick) [captain], S. M. Roberts (Selkirk), T. Henderson (Selkirk), A. B. Tod (Gala), J. Campbell (Kelso)

=== Junior matches ===
13 November 1937

South of Scotland District	5 - 17	Edinburgh District
Try: J. Grossart; Con: E. W. Marsden	Report	Try: C. McLean; G. H. Caithness x 2 Con: C. Crawford x 2 Drop: M. Cooper

Hawick

South of Scotland District: G. Wilson (Hawick Linden); R. McBain (Gala Star), E. W. Marsden (Hawick YMCA), J. Lyall (Hawick Linden), G. Brown (Hawick Linden), J. Grossart (Gala Star), J. Hogarth (Gala Star), W. Sharp (Peebles), G. K. Brunton (Walkerburn), F. Pow (Walkerburn), R. Nicholson (Peebles), D. D. Fleming (Earlston), C. Anderson (Hawick Linden), W. Ballantyre (Hawick Y.M.C.A.), and R. W. Lumsden (Gala Star).
Edinburgh District: G. L. Kemp (Edinburgh City Police), G. H. Caithness (Edinburgh City Police), G. Kerr (Edinburgh City Police), D. B. Smith (Lasswade), G. McLean (Trinity Academicals), M. Cooper (Leith Academicals), J. L. Innes (Boroughmuir) [captain], J. Wallace (Leith Academicals), A. T. Fisher (Barnton Park), D. Barclay (Penicuik), C. B. Pearson (R. D. V. C.) . J. Purves (Dunbar), C . Mitchell (Northern), C. Crawford (Edinburgh City Police), T. McMorran (Kenmore)

20 November 1937

Rest of the West	17 - 8	Glasgow District
Try: N. Lewis; W. A. Edward; W. G. Rowan x 2 J. B. Burnett; Con: W. A. Edward	Report; Report	Try: J. Ferguson; Con: J. Ferguson; Pen: J. Ferguson

Lenzie
Referee: R.W.S. Patrick (Glasgow HSFP)

Rest of the West: D. M. Duncan (Lenzie), N. Lewis (Hutchesons' GSFP), W. A. Edward (Hutchesons' GSFP), E. H. Kitson (Cambuslung), A. F. Currie (Kilmarnock), R. J. Jamieson (Cambuslang), R. H. Reid (Cambuslang) J.W. Brown (Hutchesons' GSFP) [captain], W. H. Carruthers (Lenzie), G. Hedges (Ayr), J. B. Burnett (Kilmarnock), I. Turner (Kilmarnock), I. A. Nicholl (Cartha), J. McClure (Ayr), W. G. Rowan (Hutchesons' GSFP)
Glasgow District: I. Work (Uddingston), A P. Fairlie (Shawlands A. F.P.) [captain], W. Mitchell (Bellahouslon Acads.), J. Ferguson (Albert Road Acads.), R. Dunlop (Jordanhill T.C.), W. Liddle (Albert Road Acads.), J. C. Hamilton (Albert Road Acads.), T. Drife (Glasgow Police), K. G. McKenzie (Whitecraigs), J. C. Law (Whitehill F.P.), J. Caldwell (Uddingston), G. Speed (Glasgow Police), W. Sillar (Hamilton Acads.), J. B. Hamilton (Glasgow Police), T. G. Scott (Blairhill)

27 November 1937

East of Scotland District	9 - 6	West of Scotland District
Try: C. McLean; Con: C. Crawford; Drop: M. Cooper	Preview; Report	Try: A. P. Fairlie; Pen: D. M. Duncan

Murrayfield

East of Scotland District: G. L. Kemp (Edinburgh City Police), G. H. Caithness (Edinburgh City Police), E. W. Marsden (Hawick Y.M.C.A.) [captain], D. B. Smith (Lasswade), C. McLean (Trinity Academicals), M. Cooper (Leith Academicals), J. L. McInnes (Boroughmuir), W. Sharp (Peebles), G. K. Brunton (Walkerburn), J. Wallace (Leith Academicals), R. Nicholson (Peebles), D. Barclay (Penicuik), A. T. Fisher (Barnton Park), C. Crawford (Edinburgh City Police), C. Mitchell (Edinburgh Northern)
West of Scotland District: D. M. Duncan (Lenzie), A. F. Currie (Kilmarnock), J. Ferguson (Albert Road Academicals), W. Mitchell (Bellahouston Academicals), A. P. Fairlie (Shawlands Academy F.P.), W. Liddle (Albert Road Academicals), J. C. Hamilton (Albert Road Academicals), J. W. Brown (Hutchesons' GSFP) [captain], W. H. Carruthers (Lenzie), G. Hedges (Ayr), J. B. Burnett (Kilmarnock), J. C. Law (Whitehill School F.P.), W. G. Rowan (Hutchesons' GSFP), J. McClure (Ayr), T. R. Graham (Hutchesons' GSFP)

=== Trial matches ===
18 December 1937

Scotland Probables	called off	Scotland Possibles
	Preview

Murrayfield Stadium

Scotland Probables: Charles Grieve (Duke of Wellington's Regt.), Archibald Drummond (Kelvinside Academicals), Charles Dick (Guy's Hospital), Duncan Macrae (St Andrews University), Robert Wilson Shaw (Glasgow HSFP), Rab Bruce Lockhart (Cambridge University), Tom Dorward (Gala), J. A. Reid (London Scottish), Peter Tait (Royal HSFP), William Inglis (Royal Engineers), Christian Melville (Black Watch), George Horsburgh (London Scottish), William Young (Cambridge University), Jock Waters (Selkirk), Maurice Henderson (Dunfermline)
Scotland Possibles: J. Dun (Gala), G. H. Caithness (Edinburgh Police), T. C. Brown (Watsonians), E. C. Hunter (Watsonians), N. A. Gillanders (Panmure), I. G. P. Thomson (Melville F.P.), Kenneth Wilson (Watsonians), R. Cowe (Melrose), Bob Grieve (Kelso), Allan Roy (Waterloo), Jock Beattie (Hawick), G. Officer (Montrose), Duncan Shaw (Sale), D. K. A. MacKenzie (Edinburgh Wanderers), Wilf Crawford (United Services)

15 January 1938
2.15pm

Scotland Probables	13 - 23	Scotland Possibles
Try: Ross Logan; Jock Waters; Duncan Macrae; Con: Christian Melville x 2	Report; Report	Try: William Renwick x 2 Wilf Crawford; Johnny Johnston; Rab Bruce Lockhart; Maurice Henderson; Thomson; Con: Allan Roy

Murrayfield Stadium
Attendance: 5,000
Referee: F. J. C. Moffat (SRU)

Scotland Probables: Charles Grieve (Oxford University), Archibald Drummond (Kelvinside Academicals), Charles Dick (Guy's Hospital), Duncan Macrae (St Andrews University), Robert Dryden (Watsonians) and after 10 minutes on Dryden's injury N. A. Gillanders (Panmure), Rab Bruce Lockhart (Cambridge University), Ross Logan (Edinburgh Wanderers), J. A. Reid (London Scottish), Peter Tait (Royal HSFP), William Blackadder (West of Scotland), Christian Melville (Black Watch), George Horsburgh (London Scottish), William Young (Cambridge University), Jock Waters (Selkirk), Maurice Henderson (Dunfermline) - later J. Dun (Gala), Bob Grieve (Kelso), Jock Beattie (Hawick) and Wilf Crawford (United Services) played for the Probables in the second half.
Scotland Possibles: J. Dun (Gala); Johnny Johnston (Cambridge University), E. C. Hunter (Watsonians), John Forrest (Cambridge University), William Renwick (Edinburgh Wanderers), Robert Wilson Shaw (Glasgow HSFP), Kenneth Wilson (Watsonians), R. Cowe (Melrose), Bob Grieve (Kelso), Jake Borthwick (Stewart's College F.P.), Jock Beattie (Hawick), Allan Roy (Waterloo), Duncan Shaw (Sale), Laurie Duff (Glasgow Academicals), Wilf Crawford (United Services) - later George Roberts (Watsonians), I.G.P. Thomson (Melville F.P.), Tom Dorward (Gala), John Hastie (Melrose) also used. Rab Bruce Lockhart (Cambridge University), William Blackadder (West of Scotland), George Horsburgh (London Scottish) and Maurice Henderson (Dunfermline) played for the Possibles in the second half.

=== English matches ===
No other District matches played.

=== International matches ===
No touring matches this season.
