= 1938–39 Scottish Districts season =

Rugby union competition

- Countries: Scotland
- Date: 1938–39
- Matches played: 1

The 1938–39 Scottish Districts season is a record of all the rugby union matches for Scotland's district teams.

== History ==
Edinburgh District beat Glasgow District in the Inter-City match.

== Results ==
Date	Try	Conversion	Penalty	Dropped goal	Goal from mark	Notes
1905–1947	3 points	2 points	3 points	4 points	3 points	

=== Inter-City ===
3 December 1938

Glasgow District	9 – 16	Edinburgh District
Try: Robert Wilson Shaw; Pen: W.C.W. Murdoch x 2	Report	Try: John Craig; Pen: A. Reid x 3 Drop: A. Reid

Old Anniesland
Attendance: 7,000
Referee: J. H. Ferguson (Gala)

Glasgow District: A. S. Nicolson (Hillhead HSFP), A. P. Fairlie (Shawlands F. P.), Robert Wilson Shaw (Glasgow HSFP), William Gibson Biggart (Glasgow Academicals), J. M. Sinclair (Glasgow University), W.C.W. Murdoch (Hillhead HSFP), I. E. Dawson (Hillhead HSFP), J. D. Niven (Hillhead HSFP), I. Wilkie (Hillhead HSFP), R. C. Graham (Hillhead HSFP), Vivian Weston (Kelvinside Academicals), J. L. McClure (Ayr), T. R. Graham (Hutchesons GSFP), Laurie Duff (Glasgow Academicals), J. Macdonald (Kelvinside Academicals)
Edinburgh District: George Roberts (Watsonians), John Craig (Heriots), D. T. Gollogly (Royal HSFP), A. A. S. Scott (Edinburgh Wanderers), William Renwick (Edinburgh Wanderers), A. Reid (Watsonians), Ernie Anderson (Stewart's College F. P.), Jake Borthwick (Stewart's College F. P.), G. W. Wilson (Watsonians), Ian Henderson (Edinburgh Academicals), David Deas (Watsonians), D. U. Dewar (Watsonians), G. H. Hendry (Watsonians), D. K. A. MacKenzie (Edinburgh Wanderers), George Gallie (Edinburgh Academicals)

=== Other Scottish matches ===
5 November 1938

North of Scotland District	–	Midlands District

Aberdeen

North of Scotland District:
Midlands District:

19 November 1938

North of Scotland District	–	South of Scotland District

St. Andrews

North of Scotland District:
South of Scotland District:

19 November 1938

Rest of the West	–	Glasgow District

Lenzie

Rest of the West:
Glasgow District:

=== Junior matches ===
12 November 1938

South of Scotland District	–	Edinburgh District

Earlston

South of Scotland District:
Edinburgh District:

=== Trial matches ===
17 December 1938

Blues Trial	10 – 0	Whites Trial
	Report

Blues Trial:
Whites Trial:

14 January 1939

Scotland Probables	8 – 17	Scotland Possibles
	Report

Probables:
Possibles:

=== English matches ===
No other District matches played.

=== International matches ===
No touring matches this season.
