= 1931–32 Scottish Districts season =

Rugby union competition

- Countries: Scotland
- Date: 1931–32
- Matches played: 1

The 1931–32 Scottish Districts season is a record of all the rugby union matches for Scotland's district teams.

== History ==
Edinburgh District beat Glasgow District in the Inter-City match.

The principal dates for season 1931-32 will be:—- October 28, Glasgow District v. South Africans; October 31, South of Scotland v. South Africans at Melrose; November 7, North v. Midlands at Dundee; November 21, North v. South at Selkirk; December 19, Scotland (Probables) v. Rest (Possibles) at Murrayfield; January 9, North of Scotland v. South Africans at Aberdeen; January 16. Scotland v. South Africa at Murrayfield; February 7, Scotland v. Wales at Murrayfield; February 21. Scotland v. Ireland at Murrayfield: March i 9, Scotland v. England Twickenham.

North v Midlands. Glasgow v South Africa 28 October 1931.

South v South Africa 31 October 1931.

== Results ==
Date	Try	Conversion	Penalty	Dropped goal	Goal from mark	Notes
1905–1947	3 points	2 points	3 points	4 points	3 points	

=== Inter-City ===
5 December 1931

Glasgow District	6 – 11	Edinburgh District
	Report

Old Anniesland
Attendance: 7,000
Referee: Willie Burnet (Hawick)

Glasgow District:
Edinburgh District:

=== Other Scottish matches ===
7 November 1931

Midlands District	–	North of Scotland District
	Preview

Dundee

Midlands District:
North of Scotland District:

21 November 1931

South of Scotland District	–	North of Scotland District
	Preview

Selkirk

South of Scotland District:
North of Scotland District:

21 November 1931

West of Scotland District	–	Rest of the West

Glasgow

West of Scotland District:
Rest of West:

28 November 1931

East of Scotland District	–	West of Scotland District

Glasgow

East of Scotland District:
West of Scotland District:

=== Junior matches ===
21 November 1931

Edinburgh District	–	Glasgow District
	Preview

Edinburgh

Edinburgh District:
Glasgow District:

19 March 1932

Edinburgh District	–	South of Scotland District
	Preview

Edinburgh

Edinburgh District:
South of Scotland District:

=== Trial matches ===
19 December 1931

Scotland Probables	17 – 8	Scotland Possibles
Try: R. J. Henderson; Max Simmers; Harry Lind; Doddie Wood; James Forrest; Con: Jock Allan	Preview; Report; Report	Try: Jimmie Graham x 2 Con: W. Nicolson

Murrayfield Stadium
Referee: R. L. H. Donald (Glasgow HSFP)

Probables: A. H. Piper (West of Scotland), F. M. Mathieson (Gala), Doddie Wood (Gala), Ian Shaw (Glasgow HSFP), Max Simmers (Glasgow Academicals), Harry Lind (Dunfermline), Ross Logan (Edinburgh University), Jock Allan (Melrose), Hugh Mackintosh (West of Scotland), Alexander Walker (Birkenhead Park), Mac Henderson (Edinburgh Academicals), Willie Welsh (Hawick), Jimmie Graham (Kelso), Peter Tait (Royal HSFP), R. J. Henderson (Edinburgh Academicals)
Possibles: D. Murray (Royal HSFP), James Forrest (Glasgow Academicals), W. G. Spowart (Glasgow HSFP), W. Nicolson (West of Scotland), G. R. Gunn (Royal HSFP), B. R. Tod (Edinburgh Academicals), J. P. McArthur (Waterloo), William Roughead (London Scottish), Frank Waters (London Scottish), G. C. Scott (Glasgow Academicals), Jim Thom (Watsonians), Francis Wright (Edinburgh Academicals), James Wilson (St. Andrews University), Jack Watherston (Cambridge University), George Ritchie (Dundee HSFP)
Replacements: Mark Stewart (Stewart's College), W. Moir (Heriots); F. M. Mathieson, Jimmie Graham and Peter Tait (Probables) swapped with James Forrest, William Roughead and Frank Waters (Possibles) for the second half.

=== English matches ===
No other District matches played.

=== International matches ===
28 October 1931

Glasgow District	13 – 21	South Africa
	Preview; Report

Glasgow District:
South Africa:

31 October 1931

South of Scotland District	0 – 0	South Africa
	Report; Report

South of Scotland District:
South Africa:

9 January 1932

North of Scotland District	0 – 9	South Africa
	Preview

North of Scotland District:
South Africa:
