= Kenneth Wilson (rugby union) =

Scotland international rugby union player

- Born: Kenneth Stephen Horace Wilson; 7 July 1914 Kolkata, India
- Died: 22 March 1984 (aged 69) Dunfermline, Scotland

Rugby union career
- Position: Scrum Half
Amateur team(s)
Years	Team	Apps	(Points)
- Watsonians
–	London Scottish		
–	Army		
Provincial / State sides
Years	Team	Apps	(Points)
1938	Scotland Possibles	1	(0)
International career
Years	Team	Apps	(Points)
1946	Scotland	1	(0)

Kenneth Wilson (7 July 1914 - 22 March 1984) was a Scotland international rugby union player.

== Rugby Union career ==
=== Amateur career ===
He played for Watsonians. A 1938 match against F.J.C. Moffat's XV showed Wilson in fine form and Scottish selectors viewed that match as a de facto trial match.

He last played for Watsonians in 1952 in an Old Crocks match against their then current players.

=== Provincial career ===
He was due to play for the Scotland Possibles side on 18 December 1937 but that match was called off. He did though play for the Possibles side against Scotland Probables on 15 January 1938. The Possibles side won the match by six tries to three in a 23 - 13 win. One Watsonian Robert Dryden played for the Probables, while Wilson played with Eric Hunter and replacement George Roberts for the Possibles.

=== International career ===
He was not due to play in the Victory match against England in 1946, but was due to play for the Co-Optimists against Cambridge Vandals. However he was called up as a replacement for Tom Dorward. Ross Logan took his place in the Co-Optimists side instead.

He played for Scotland against England at Twickenham on 16 March 1946. He played at scrum half and his fellow Watsonian Ian Lumsden played at stand off.

He was posthumously awarded his Scotland cap when the SRU decided to give full caps for the Services matches in the Second World War.

== Military career ==
He was a 2nd Lieutenant in the Royal Sussex regiment. He stayed in the army after World War II ended, eventually becoming a Colonel.

== Cricket career ==
He played for an Indian 'European' side in two first class matches as a wicket keeper.

== Death ==
He died on 22 March 1984 at Milesmark Hospital in Dunfermline. His usual address was at Gowerfield, Culross. His funeral was at Falkirk crematorium on 26 March 1984.
