= Sammy Sampson =

- Born: Ralph William Fraser Sampson; 26 September 1913 Chile
- Died: 31 January 2003 (aged 89) Bishopton, Renfrewshire, Scotland

Rugby union career
- Position: Hooker
Amateur team(s)
Years	Team	Apps	(Points)
1937-47	London Scottish		
- Kelvinside-West
- Co-Optimists
Provincial / State sides
Years	Team	Apps	(Points)
1938	Blues Trial		
1939	Scotland Probables		
- 1947	Middlesex; London Counties		
International career
Years	Team	Apps	(Points)
1939-47	Scotland	2	(0)
- Barbarians

Sammy Sampson (26 September 1913 – 31 January 2003) was a Scotland international rugby union player.

== Rugby union career ==
=== Amateur career ===
Sampson played for London Scottish.

He played for the Co-Optimists.

He played for Kelvinside-West.

=== Provincial career ===
He played for Blues Trial against Whites Trial on 17 December 1938.

He then played for Scotland Probables against Scotland Possibles on 14 January 1939.

He played for Middlesex and London Counties after the Second World War. He captained London against Australia in 1947 on Boxing Day.

=== International career ===
He played for Scotland twice in the period 1939 to 1947.

He also played for the Barbarians.

== Military career ==
He joined the London Scottish Territorials in 1937. When the war started he was commissioned in the Queen's Own Cameron Highlanders 6th battalion, but he transferred to the Royal Air Force.

He was a Spitfire pilot in the Second World War. He joined the 602 City of Glasgow squadron. He flew in the Dieppe Raid and destroyed two Focke-Wulfs and damaged two Dorniers.

He then joined the 131 County of Kent squadron, and downed another five Focke-Wulfs.

He was appointed to command the Free French wing, and taught them how to fly the Spitfire. He flew 189 operations in the war.

After the war, he commanded the West of Scotland Air Training Corps.

He wrote a book Spitfire Offensive: A Fighter Pilot's War Memoir recounting his actions.

== Business career ==
He was a managing director of Ault & Wiborg Company. This was a firm that supplied printing ink to newspaper groups.

== Family ==
His family were based in Chile and were railway entrepreneurs in the country.

He married Margaret Lenny in 1946. They met at a London Scottish ball that same year.
