= William Agnew =

William Agnew may refer to:

- Sir William Agnew, 1st Baronet (1825–1910), English politician
- William Agnew (footballer) (1880–1936), Scottish footballer (national team)
- Billy Agnew (1898–?), Scottish footballer (Port Vale, Luton Town)
- Sir William Agnew (Royal Navy officer) (1898–1960), British admiral
- Bill Agnew (1910–1961), Scotland international rugby union player
