= John Forrest (rugby union) =

Scotland international rugby union player

- Born: John Forrest; 28 April 1917 Salisbury, Southern Rhodesia
- Died: 14 September 1942 (aged 25) near Northwich, Cheshire, England
- School: Strathallan School
- University: University of Cambridge

Rugby union career
- Position: Wing
Amateur team(s)
Years	Team	Apps	(Points)
- Cambridge University
Provincial / State sides
Years	Team	Apps	(Points)
1938	Scotland Possibles		
International career
Years	Team	Apps	(Points)
1938	Scotland	3	(6)

John Gordon Scott Forrest (28 April 1917 – 14 September 1942) was a Scotland international rugby union player. He was also a Royal Navy Fleet Air Arm pilot who was killed in World War II.

== Education ==
John Forrest was born in Rhodesia and educated at Strathallan School in Perthshire and St Catharine's College, Cambridge where he read medicine. At school he excelled at most sports becoming captain of rugby and cricket.

== Rugby Union career ==
=== Amateur career ===
He played rugby union for Cambridge University. Forrest received his first blue for Cambridge in 1936 and was appointed captain of the side in 1938.

=== Provincial career ===
He played for the Scotland Possibles side in their trial match against the Scotland Probables on 15 January 1938.

=== International career ===
Forrest was capped three times for Scotland in the Triple Crown winning team of 1938. He made his debut in Edinburgh on 5 February in an 8–6 win over Wales. Forrest scored two tries in a 23–14 win against Ireland three weeks later at Murrayfield. This victory set up a Triple Crown decider with England at Twickenham. On 19 March 1938 Scotland beat England 21–16, scoring a record five tries to one, to achieve their eighth Triple Crown. The match was the first rugby international broadcast live on television. Due to injury and the outbreak of World War II, Forrest never played for Scotland again.

== Military career ==
John Forrest was serving as a lieutenant in the Air Branch of the Royal Naval Volunteer Reserve based at HMS Blackcap when he lost his life in 1942. On 28 August 1942, 880 Naval Air Squadron disembarked from HMS Indomitable (92) to dispose of their Sea Hurricanes and refit with the Supermarine Seafire at HMS Blackcap in Cheshire. During formation practice on 14 September 1942, a Spitfire VB (AB873) based at HMS Blackcap collided with another Spitfire (BL487) at a height of around 7,000 feet. AB 873 crashed at Pownall Green Farm, Tabley, near Northwich and Lt JGS Forrest was killed. On 21 September 880 Squadron moved to RNAS Machrihanish near Campbeltown in Scotland.

== Death ==
The following obituaries were published shortly after his death:-

The Scotsman newspaper on Tuesday 29 September 1942:

Rugby men everywhere will have read with deep regret of the death in action of that grand Scots international three-quarter J.G.S. Forrest, R.N. Air Arm. No matter whether he was in the centre or on the wing, every time he pulled more than his weight. I saw his Freshman’s match at Cambridge. He was not in either team as they lined out but, upon a centre having to go off crocked, Forrest came on to take his place. It was seen in the twinkling of an eye that Cambridge had here a "find". He never looked back, got his Blue as a Fresher, and from that, my first view of him to my last when I saw him get a try "in a hundred" last year at Taunton he never gave a bad or a poor game in my seeing. He and H. D. Freakes, the two mighty opposites in a well-remembered tackle in a Varsity match, when both were in the centre, have now made the great sacrifice, lamented by all who ever knew them or only saw them play.

D.R. Gent, writing in The Sunday Times in 1942:

Forrest was a magnificent player, whether on the wing or in the centre. I preferred him in the centre, where his running and serving and side-stepping and kicking and passing gave me no end of pleasure; and I am sure that in this modest and charming young Scotsman we have lost a great rugby footballer in the making.

== See also ==
- List of Scottish rugby union players killed in World War II
- 1938 Home Nations Championship
