= Jerry Foster =

Scotland international rugby union player

- Born: Robert Amos Foster; 7 December 1907 Hallrule, Scottish Borders, Scotland
- Died: 17 July 1984 (aged 76) Hawick, Scotland

Rugby union career
- Position: Prop
Amateur team(s)
Years	Team	Apps	(Points)
- Hawick
Provincial / State sides
Years	Team	Apps	(Points)
- South
International career
Years	Team	Apps	(Points)
1930-32	Scotland	4	(0)

Robert "Jerry" Amos Foster (7 December 1907 – 17 July 1984) was a Scotland international rugby union player. He played at Prop.

== Rugby Union career ==
=== Amateur career ===
He played as a forward for Hawick.

The former commentator Bill McLaren mentions Foster as one of the Hawick greats that he grew up with:

"I was brought up on stories of the great Scottish players of the twenties, many of whom I never saw play but knew all about... I used to go with my father to see matches at a very early age, the great Hawick heroes including Willie Welsh, Jock Beattie and Jerry Foster, so I had an all-consuming desire to wear the green jersey of Hawick."

=== Provincial career ===
He represented South against the North of Scotland on 19 November 1932.

=== International career ===
Foster was capped by Scotland four times.

He made his debut against Wales in the Five Nations match at Murrayfield Stadium on 1 February 1930.

His last match was the Home Nations match against England at Twickenham on 19 March 1932.
