= Lorn Cowie, Lord Cowie =

Scotland international rugby union player (1926–2026)

Lorn Cowie
- Born: William Lorn Kerr Cowie; 1 June 1926 Glasgow, Scotland
- Died: 23 October 2026 (aged 100)
- School: Fettes College
- University: Cambridge University; Glasgow University

Rugby union career
- Position: No.8
Amateur team(s)
Years	Team	Apps	(Points)
-	Kelvinside-West		
–	West of Scotland		
–	Edinburgh Wanderers		
Provincial / State sides
Years	Team	Apps	(Points)
-	Glasgow District		
-	Edinburgh District		
International career
Years	Team	Apps	(Points)
1953	Scotland	1	(0)

William Lorn Kerr Cowie, Lord Cowie (1 June 1926 – 23 October 2026) was a Scottish Senator of the College of Justice and Scotland international rugby union player.

== Rugby union career ==
=== Amateur career ===
Cowie played rugby at Fettes where he played Centre. He attended Clare College, Cambridge after Fettes but his studies were interrupted by WWII.

In Glasgow, Cowie played and captained Kelvinside-West after the 2nd world war.

Kelvinside-West was a short term club merger fix for a post-war player shortage and as numbers increased the constituent clubs of Kelvinside Academicals and West of Scotland once again went their own ways. When that happened Cowie played for West of Scotland.

His legal work took him to Edinburgh and Cowie then played for Edinburgh Wanderers.

=== Provincial career ===
Starting off in Glasgow with Kelvinside-West, Cowie first represented Glasgow District and played for them against Edinburgh District in the Inter-City match.

Cowie played for Edinburgh District in the Inter-City and the Scottish Inter-District Championship.

He played for Edinburgh in the 1954–55 Scottish Inter-District Championship match against the South.

Cowie is one of the few players of the era to play for both Glasgow District and Edinburgh District.

=== International career ===
Cowie was capped for Scotland once in 1953. He played in the Five Nations match against England at Twickenham Stadium on 21 March that year.

In his rugby career he played as a No.8.

== Law career ==
Cowie became a Senator of the College of Justice in 1977.

He joined the Faculty of Advocates in Edinburgh in 1952, becoming an Advocate Depute in the Crown Office Scotland staying there till 1967. He was made Queen's Counsel in 1967. He reprised his role as Advocate Depute from 1969 to 1977.

Cowie became a Senator of the College of Justice in Scotland, staying in the role from 1977 to 1994.

He then became a Judge of the Court of Appeal, Botswana from 1995 to 1998.

== Death ==
Cowie died on 23 October 2026, aged 100.
