= Duncan Macrae (rugby union) =

British rugby union player (1914–2007)

- Born: Duncan James Macrae; 4 November 1914 Balmacara, Scotland
- Died: 15 May 2007 (aged 92) Gairloch, Scotland

Rugby union career
- Position: Centre
Amateur team(s)
Years	Team	Apps	(Points)
- St. Andrews University
Provincial / State sides
Years	Team	Apps	(Points)
1937	North of Scotland District		
1938	Scotland Probables		
International career
Years	Team	Apps	(Points)
1937-39	Scotland	9	(3)
1938	British and Irish Lions	1	(0)

Duncan James Macrae (4 November 1914 – 15 May 2007) was a player for the Scotland national rugby union team playing 9 games at centre between 1937 and 1939., as well as for the British Isles team

== Early life and career ==
Macrae was born in Balmacara in 1914 and attended primary school in Auchtertyre, walking several kilometres to and from school. He went to boarding school at the Edinburgh Academy between 1925 and 1933 before going to the University of St Andrews to study medicine graduating in 1939.

== Rugby Union career ==
=== Amateur career ===
He also played club rugby for St Andrews University, and attracted attention for his skill and sportsmanship leading to a tour with the Barbarians.

=== Provincial career ===
Macrae played for North of Scotland District combined side in their match against South of Scotland District on 20 November 1937.

He was then selected for the Scotland Probables side in the trial match against Scotland Possibles. The first trial on 18 December 1937 fell foul of the weather, but Macrae turned out for Probables on 15 January 1938.

=== International career ===
Macrae played his first test for Scotland against the Wales in 1937. His best season was in 1938 scoring a try against the Irish The highlight of the season was a victory against the English at Twickenham securing the Triple Crown for Scotland. Macrae formed a great backline combination with Wilson Shaw and Charles Dick for Scotland.

Macrae's good form led to selection as a member of the 1938 British Lions tour to South Africa. He played in 11 of the first 15 matches of the tour including the first test in Johannesburg but injury ended his tour prematurely. His rugby career was ended by World War II.

== Subsequent life ==
He enlisted in the Territorial Army of 4th/5th Seaforth Highlanders together with his brother Farquhar Macrae. In January 1940, he went to France with the 51st Highland Division serving at medical officer. Macrae was awarded a Military Cross for his part in the battle at Saint-Valery-en-Caux but was captured in June 1940 along with others in his Division. He volunteered to serve as medical officer at Stalag VIII-B, Lamsdorf, Upper Silesia.

On his return to Scotland, Macrae practised as a doctor in Dingwall for 30 years before retiring to Gairloch. He married Joan Harris of Winnipeg and raised five children with her. Macrae was a keen churchgoer as well as serving as president of the Ross Sutherland Rugby Football Club and the Caberfeidh Curling Club.

Macrae died in May 2007 in Gairloch.

== See also ==
Notable Highland players are few and far between, but two notable examples are:

- Nairn McEwan
- John Bannerman
