= Bill Purdie =

- Born: William Henry Purdie; 24 June 1910 Jedburgh, Scotland
- Died: 22 November 1997 (aged 87) Jedburgh, Scotland

Rugby union career
- Position: Prop
Amateur team(s)
Years	Team	Apps	(Points)
- Jed-Forest
Provincial / State sides
Years	Team	Apps	(Points)
1931 -	South of Scotland District		
- Whites Trial
- Scotland Probables
International career
Years	Team	Apps	(Points)
1939	Scotland	3	(0)

Bill Purdie (24 June 1910 – 22 November 1997) was a Scotland international rugby union player.

== Rugby Union career ==
=== Amateur career ===
He played for Jed-Forest.

=== Provincial career ===
He turned out for the South of Scotland District in 1931. The Jedburgh Gazette of 13 January 1939 stating:

It eight years since he turned out in his first representative match, filling a vacancy in the South team at the last moment, when J. Beattie, Hawick, had to withdraw, and, according to the Gazette files, a daily paper critic described hint as "one of the best forwards on the field" that day. Strangely enough, another critic said practically the same about hint after the Selkirk trial a few weeks ago. Purdie has led the Jedforest team on four occasions and has all along been a whole-hearted club player, so it would set the seal on a splendid football career were he to be "capped."

He was capped for Whites Trial on 17 December 1938.

After a good showing, he then played for Scotland Probables in the final trial that season.

=== International career ===
He was capped 3 times for Scotland in 1939.
