= Arthur Dorward =

Scotland international rugby union player

- Born: Arthur Fairgrieve Dorward; 3 March 1925 Galashiels, Scotland
- Died: 4 August 2015 (aged 90) Melrose, Scotland
- School: Sedbergh School
- University: University of Cambridge
- Notable relative(s): Tom Dorward, brother Ali Williams, 1st cousin (twice removed)

Rugby union career
- Position: Scrum-half
Amateur team(s)
Years	Team	Apps	(Points)
-	Cambridge University R.U.F.C.		
–	Gala RFC		
Provincial / State sides
Years	Team	Apps	(Points)
-	South of Scotland		
International career
Years	Team	Apps	(Points)
1950-57	Scotland	15	(3)
–	Barbarians		

Arthur Fairgrieve Dorward (3 March 1925 – 4 August 2015) was a Scottish international rugby union player who played fifteen matches between 1950 – 1957.

== Rugby Union career ==
=== Amateur career ===
Dorward was born in 1925 in Galashiels. He was educated at St. Mary's School, Melrose, and Sedbergh School in Cumbria, where he was head boy. Dorward proceeded to St John's College, Cambridge, where he graduated with a degree in French and German.

He played rugby for Cambridge University R.U.F.C. for three seasons, winning three blues and captaining the team in his final year. He was also a member of the 1948 Oxford-Cambridge rugby union tour of Argentina.

Following his graduation he returned to Galashiels, to work for the family textile business, and play for Gala RFC, for whom he had already made his debut aged 17.

All his club rugby was played with Gala, with whom he played for fifteen years, before retiring at the age of 32. He captained Gala for three seasons between 1954 and 1957. Leading the team to the 'unofficial' Scottish championship in 1957. He also won several Borders Sevens winners' medals at Gala, Hawick and Jed-Forest.

=== Provincial career ===
Dorward also represented the South of Scotland in the Scottish Inter-District Championship. He played for the South against New Zealand, Australia and South Africa in tour matches. He was selected for the Barbarians several times and was a member of the 1957 Barbarians tour of Canada.

=== International career ===
Dorward made his debut for Scotland against France in the 1950 Five Nations Championship. Scotland won the match 8–5 at Murrayfield. His next match was against South Africa at Murrayfield on their 1951–52 South Africa rugby union tour. Scotland lost 44–0; one of seventeen consecutive defeats between 1951 and 1955.

In the 1952 Five Nations Championship he played against Wales, Ireland and England. He became the first Gala player to captain Scotland for the match against England. England won the match 19–3 at Murrayfield. Dorward captained Scotland twice during the 1953 Five Nations Championship against France and Wales. He also played in the defeat to England at Twickenham.

Dorward played one match in the 1955 Five Nations Championship in the loss to France. The following year he played against Ireland and England in the 1956 Five Nations Championship; losing both matches. He played four matches in the 1957 Five Nations Championship, which included two victories. A win against the French in Paris and another against Wales at Murrayfield. His final two matches for Scotland ended in defeat. A loss to Ireland at Murrayfield and defeat to England at Twickenham.

One of the highlights of his career was scoring a drop goal against Wales at Murrayfield to win the match 9–6 in 1957. He scored from just short of the halfway line and ten metres in from touch; his only international points.

== Famous relatives ==
Arthurs brother Tom Dorward was also capped for Scotland.

The New Zealand lock, Ali Williams', maternal grandfather was his cousin.
