= 1943–44 Scottish Districts season =

Rugby union competition

- Countries: Scotland
- Date: 1943-44
- Matches played: 1

The 1943–44 Scottish Districts season is a record of all the rugby union matches for Scotland's district teams.

== History ==
There was no Inter-City match this year due to the Second World War.

Glasgow District played an Army XV side.

== Results ==
Date	Try	Conversion	Penalty	Dropped goal	Goal from mark	Notes
1905–1947	3 points	2 points	3 points	4 points	3 points	

=== Inter-City ===
None.

=== Other Scottish matches ===
12 February 1944

Glasgow District	6 - 13	Army XV
Try: T. C. Barras x 2	Report	Try: R. Daly; J. A. Waters; D. A. Sheriff; Con: A. S. Kydd x 2

Old Anniesland, Glasgow
Referee: Harry Lind

Glasgow District:
Army XV:

25 March 1944

West of Scotland District	12 - 12	East of Scotland District
	Preview; Report

Old Anniesland, Glasgow

West of Scotland District:
East of Scotland District:

=== English matches ===
No other District matches played.

=== International matches ===
No touring matches this season.
