= Harry Hutton =

- Born: Alexander Harold Miller Hutton; 30 December 1907 Comrie, Fife, Scotland
- Died: 23 December 1981 (aged 73) Surrey, England

Rugby union career
- Position: Full Back
Amateur team(s)
Years	Team	Apps	(Points)
- Dunfermline
Provincial / State sides
Years	Team	Apps	(Points)
1930	Midlands District		
1930-33	North of Scotland District		
International career
Years	Team	Apps	(Points)
1932	Scotland	1	(0)

Harry Hutton (30 December 1907 – 23 December 1981) was a Scotland international rugby union player.

== Rugby Union career ==
=== Amateur career ===
He played for Dunfermline. He was injured for the most part of the 1933–34 season but he was made captain of the club for the 1934–35 season.

=== Provincial career ===
He played for Midlands District in their match against North of Scotland District on 8 November 1930.

The Aberdeen Press and Journal of 10 November 1930 reported:

A. H. M Hutton at fullback not only made no mistakes, but in kicking five consecutive goals showed how valuable he would be in any side.

Hutton was then picked for the composite North of Scotland District side to play against the South of Scotland District on 22 November 1930. The match was played in miserable rain and wind, and resulted in a draw. He played in the same fixture for North on 18 November 1933.

=== International career ===
He was capped just the once for Scotland in 1932. Injury was said to have robbed him of future caps.

== Cricket career ==
He was a wicket-keeper for Fifeshire. In 1933 he had to get an operation on his hand which stopped him playing both cricket and rugby, though he returned to both sports.

== Family ==
His father was a county councillor for Carnock and Saline, and a Secretary of Oakley United.

Harry Hutton married Winifred Macdonald in 1939. Macdonald was a gymnastics teacher in Dundee.
