= George Thom (rugby union) =

- Born: George Thom; 13 March 1890 Strathmiglo, Scotland
- Died: 27 August 1927 (aged 37) Trail, British Columbia, Canada
- School: Kirkcaldy High School

Rugby union career
- Position: Flanker
Amateur team(s)
Years	Team	Apps	(Points)
1910-20	Kirkcaldy		
1919-20	RAFRU		
Provincial / State sides
Years	Team	Apps	(Points)
1919	Midlands District		
1919	North of Scotland District		
1919	Provinces District		
1921-23	British Columbia		
International career
Years	Team	Apps	(Points)
1920	Scotland	4	(0)

George Thom (13 March 1890 – 27 August 1927) was a Scotland international rugby union player.

== Rugby Union career ==
=== Amateur career ===
Thom played for Kirkcaldy. He played for them in early 1910 before his first emigration to Canada, and returned to play for them after the First World War ended.

The Edinburgh Evening News of Thursday 1 September 1927 noted:

He was one of the most useful scrummagers in the country during that [1919-1920] season, being heavy, with a good turn of speed, though never displaying much 'showiness' in his play.

The Dundee Courier of Thursday 30 September 1920 called his emigration from Kirkcaldy to Canada 'a national loss', though Kirkcaldy was not expected to be a weaker club in the 1920–21 season.

Although still in Canada, he was elected a patron of the club in 1923.

He played for the RAFRU in a number of games. He was injured in a match for the RAF against the Royal Navy Depot on Wednesday 18 February 1919. He was playing alongside William Wakefield in that match. He even turned out for RAFRU against a Canada military side.

=== Provincial career ===
He played for Midlands District against North of Scotland District on 6 December 1919.

He then played for the combined North side to play the South of Scotland a week later on 13 December 1919.

He was originally selected for the Scotland Probables side in the final trial match in January 1920, but owing to an injury sustained after the Scotland versus France match earlier in the month he could not play.

He was then picked for the Provinces District to play against Cities District on 20 December 1919.

He played for British Columbia in Canada from 1921 to 1923. He quit rugby as his knee was injured on Christmas Day, 1923, although the province still had the benefit of his advice.

=== International career ===
He played for Scotland 4 times, all in 1920.

== Ice Hockey career ==
On moving to back to Canada he took up ice hockey, and became captain of the local team.

== Military career ==
He moved to Canada in May 1910. At the outbreak of the First World War, he joined the Canadian Flying Corps; and was stationed in Dunkirk as a member of the Canadian Naval Royal Air Force.

He received his Royal Aero Club certificate in 1915. He was a Flight Sub Lieutenant in the Royal Navy; the RAF not yet formed. He was later noted as a Captain for the RAF in 1919.

He was awarded the Air Force Cross for his service in the First World War.

He returned to Canada in 1920, after playing for Scotland in the Five Nations Championship.

== Engineering career ==
He was trained as a civil engineer.

He served his apprenticeship with the firm Lockhart and Sang.

== Family ==
His father was James Thom (1844-1914) and his mother Agnes Roger Tod (1852-1937), both from Strathmiglo in Fife.

George was one of their 8 children, and their youngest son.

His nephew James Thom played for Watsonians from 1926.

== Death ==
His death was recorded as an accidental drowning.

He is buried in Old Trail Cemetery in Trail, British Columbia.
