= Mark Stewart (rugby union) =

Scotland international rugby union player

- Born: Mark Sprot Stewart; 7 January 1905 Musselburgh, Scotland
- Died: 2 March 1993 (aged 88) Melrose, Scotland

Rugby union career
- Position: Lock
Amateur team(s)
| Years | Team | Apps | (Points) |
- Stewart's College FP
Provincial / State sides
| Years | Team | Apps | (Points) |
| 1931 | Edinburgh District | | |
International career
| Years | Team | Apps | (Points) |
| 1932-34 | Scotland | 9 | (0) |

80th President of the Scottish Rugby Union
- In office 1966–1967
- Preceded by: David Thom
- Succeeded by: Rae Tod

Mark Stewart (7 January 1905 – 2 March 1993) was a Scotland international rugby union player. He became the 80th President of the Scottish Rugby Union.

== Rugby union career ==
=== Amateur career ===
Stewart played for Stewart's College FP.

=== Provincial career ===
He played for Edinburgh District in the 1931 inter-city match.

=== International career ===
He was capped nine times for Scotland in the period 1932–34.

=== Administrative career ===
He became the 80th President of the Scottish Rugby Union. He served the standard one year from 1966 to 1967.
