= Finlay Kennedy =

Scotland international rugby union player

- Born: Finlay Kennedy; 23 January 1892 Fraserburgh, Aberdeenshire, Scotland
- Died: 8 March 1925 (aged 33) Edinburgh, Scotland

Rugby union career
- Position: Prop
Amateur team(s)
Years	Team	Apps	(Points)
- Stewart's College FP
Provincial / State sides
Years	Team	Apps	(Points)
- Edinburgh District
International career
Years	Team	Apps	(Points)
1920-21	Scotland	5	(13)

Finlay Kennedy (23 January 1892 – 8 March 1925) was a Scotland international rugby union footballer. He played as a prop.

== Rugby Union career ==
=== Amateur career ===
Kennedy played for Stewart's College FP. He captained the side for season 1913–14.

=== Provincial career ===
Kennedy played in the inter-City match between Glasgow District and Edinburgh District on 3 December 1910. Edinburgh ran out victors with a 26-5 scoreline.

=== International career ===
Kennedy was capped for Scotland 5 times, all after the First World War. He scored 13 points for Scotland; and - unusually for a prop - all points came from kicks.

On 5 November 1932, some years after Kennedy's death, the Edinburgh Evening News said this of Stewarts College F.P. and Finlay Kennedy:

Yet the real basis of the College advance must be ascribed the solid work performed, season after season, the forwards. D. Lunan, G. M. Beaton, W. L. Kerr, and A. D. Lambert were all on the fringe of representative class, while Kennedy, almost as soon as he left school, was playing in trial matches, and praised for his work in loose. early 1911, Kennedy was kicking penalty goals from the vicinity of midfield. and the climax of this skill in this respect came in 1920, when he placed two magnificent 50-yard penalties against Wales at Inverleith, thereby giving Scotland her first win since 1907 over the Principality. Kennedy was a splendid leader of forwards, and was the first Stewart's man play in international Rugby.

== Military career ==
He was a Sergeant in the Lovat Scouts in the First World War. He was awarded the DCM.

== Outside of rugby union ==
Kennedy became a Stockbroker's Clerk, then a hotel manager running the Barnton Hotel in Cramond Bridge. He died at the hotel. He left £521 in his estate. His brother Angus was his next of kin.

Initial reports stated that Kennedy was 'laid to rest in the family place of sepulture at Roy Bridge, Inverness-shire'. However a bigger funeral was evidently called for. Kennedy was buried at the Dean Cemetery in Edinburgh. Alfred Lawrie represented the SRU at the funeral; and it was well attended by a number of Edinburgh rugby union clubs.
