= Willie Welsh =

British Lions & Scotland international rugby union & league footballer

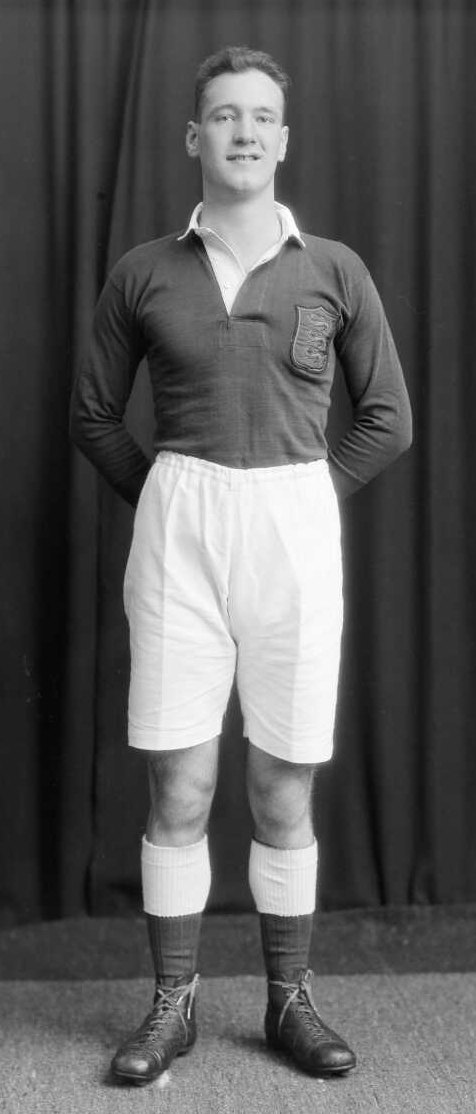
- Welsh in New Zealand in 1930

Personal information
- Full name: William Berridge Welsh
- Born: 11 February 1907; Hawick, Scotland
- Died: 27 February 1987 (aged 80); Hawick, Scotland

Playing information

Rugby union
Club
Years	Team	Pld	T	G	FG	P
	Hawick RFC	0	0	0	0	0
Representative
Years	Team	Pld	T	G	FG	P
1927	Scotland	21	0	0	0	0
1930	British Lions	0	0	0	0	0

Rugby league
Club
Years	Team	Pld	T	G	FG	P
1933–34	London Highfield	0	0	0	0	0
- As of 26 May 2021

William Berridge Welsh (11 February 1907 – 27 February 1987) was a Scottish international rugby union player, and later rugby league footballer, who played for Scotland and the Lions. Welsh scored his début try in his first international against the 1927-8 Waratahs from New South Wales, and was capped 21 times for Scotland.

He also played for Hawick.

== Rugby union ==
Welsh toured with the 1930 British Lions, including a match against the All Blacks, and was the only Scot on the squad. The Welsh player Ivor Jones, who played alongside him in the tour, described Willie Welsh as "one of the truly great forwards".

Bill McLaren, who would later play for Hawick RFC himself, remembers the game of Willie Welsh.

"I was brought up on stories of the great Scottish players of the twenties, many of whom I never saw play but knew all about… I used to go with my father to see matches at a very early age, the great Hawick heroes including Willie Welsh, Jock Beattie and Jerry Foster, so I had an all-consuming desire to wear the green jersey of Hawick."

Welsh was also a fine rugby sevens player:

"My father's generation regarded Willie as one of the finest all-round footballers ever to play for Hawick. He was best known as a loose-forward and he had speed and exceptionally safe hands. He was skilled enough to have played as a back, and indeed he did so on one famous occasion, the Jed-Forest final of 1932, that I heard about as a boy, when a Hawick seven, containing five forwards were 0–15 down at the change-over to a powerful Dunfermline seven containing internationalists Harry Lind and Alf Wilson. Some of the Hawick support were leaving the ground and they missed an incredible Hawick rally in which Willie Welsh played a major role, helping Hawick to an 18–15 victory."

== Rugby league ==
Welsh later went over to rugby league because of the unemployment crisis in the 1930s. He played for London Highfield in 1933–34. He attempted to return to Hawick RFC to coach their rugby sevens squad, but due to the strictness of the Scottish Rugby Union's rules regarding contact with rugby league, he was forced to quit after a few minutes.

== Cited sources ==
- Bath, Richard (ed.) The Scotland Rugby Miscellany (Vision Sports Publishing Ltd, 2007 ISBN 1-905326-24-6)
- McLaren, Bill Talking of Rugby (1991, Stanley Paul, London ISBN 0-09-173875-X)
