= Bob Taylor (rugby union, born 1924) =

Scotland international rugby union player

- Born: Robert Capel Taylor; 31 August 1924 Glasgow, Scotland
- Died: 27 September 2015 (aged 91) Erskine, Scotland
- School: Glenalmond College
- University: Glasgow University

Rugby union career
- Position: Flanker
Amateur team(s)
Years	Team	Apps	(Points)
- Kelvinside-West
Provincial / State sides
Years	Team	Apps	(Points)
- Glasgow District
International career
Years	Team	Apps	(Points)
1951	Scotland	4	(0)

Bob Taylor (31 August 1924 – 27 September 2015) was a Scotland international rugby union footballer. Taylor played as a Flanker.

== Rugby career ==
=== Amateur career ===
Taylor played for Kelvinside-West. When the merged team decoupled in 1951, Taylor went on to support West of Scotland.

=== Provincial career ===
Taylor played for Glasgow District against Edinburgh District in the 1948-49 season's Inter-City match.

Glasgow won the Inter-City match 9 - 3. The Glasgow Herald noted that Glasgow had several chances and could have doubled their score; one of them being Taylor's knock on which should instead have led to a try.

=== International career ===
He was capped for Scotland 4 times in 1951, playing in 3 Five Nations matches. He made his international debut against Wales playing in front of a then record crowd of 80 000 at Murrayfield Stadium.

== Outside of rugby ==
Taylor became an anaesthetist and worked at the Victoria Infirmary in Glasgow.
