= Drummond Ford =

Scotland international rugby union player

- Born: Drummond St Clair Ford; 16 December 1907
- Died: 12 December 1942 (aged 34)

Rugby union career
Amateur team(s)
Years	Team	Apps	(Points)
- United Services RFC
–	Royal Navy		
International career
Years	Team	Apps	(Points)
1930-32	Scotland	5	(9)

Lieutenant Commander Drummond St Clair Ford (16 December 1907 – 12 December 1942) was a Scottish international rugby union player, who was killed in World War II.

He was capped five times for Scotland between 1930 and 1932, scoring three tries in that period. He also played for United Services Portsmouth Rugby Football Club and Royal Navy Rugby Union.

== See also ==
- List of Scottish rugby union players killed in World War II

== Sources ==
- Bath, Richard (ed.) The Scotland Rugby Miscellany (Vision Sports Publishing Ltd, 2007 ISBN 1-905326-24-6)
- Massie, Allan A Portrait of Scottish Rugby (Polygon, Edinburgh; ISBN 0-904919-84-6)
