= List of Scottish rugby union players killed in World War II =

The following is a list of former international Scottish rugby union players killed in the Second World War.

- Tom Dorward, died on 5 March 1941
- Drummond Ford, died on 12 December 1942
- John Forrest, died on 14 September 1942.
- George Gallie, died on 16 January 1944
- D.K.A. MacKenzie, died on 12 June 1940
- Alastair McNeil, died on 26 January 1944
- Patrick Munro, died on 3 May 1942, aged 58
- William Penman, died on 3 October 1943
- William Renwick, died on 15 June 1944
- James Ritchie, died on 6 July 1942
- George Roberts, died on 2 August 1943
- William Alexander Ross, died on 28 September 1942
- Archibald Symington, died on 8 May 1941

== See also ==
- List of Scotland rugby union players killed in World War I
- Eric Liddell, who died 21 February 1945, aged 43 in a Japanese camp.
