= Ian Forsyth =

Scotland international rugby union player

- Born: Ian William Forsyth; 4 July 1946 (age 80) Edinburgh, Scotland
- School: Daniel Stewart's College

Rugby union career
- Position: Centre / Fly half
Amateur team(s)
Years	Team	Apps	(Points)
1964-73	Stewart's College FP	376	(537)
1973-83	Stewart's Melville FP		
- Correct as of 7 June 2017
Provincial / State sides
Years	Team	Apps	(Points)
1970-1980	Edinburgh District	37	(50)
-	Cities District		
International career
Years	Team	Apps	(Points)
1972–1973	Scotland	6	(4)
- Correct as of 7 June 2017

Ian William Forsyth (born 4 July 1946) is a Scottish former rugby union player who won six international caps for the Scotland national rugby union team. He played at Centre.

== Rugby Union career ==
=== Amateur career ===
Ian Forsyth was born on 4 July 1946 in Edinburgh, Scotland. He was educated at Daniel Stewart's College and played for the school XV from 1962 to 1964, captaining the 1st XV in his last year.

Forsyth made 376 appearances for Stewart's College FP and Stewart's Melville FP 1st XV, scoring 537 points including 123 tries.

=== Provincial career ===
He played for Edinburgh District 37 times from 1970 to 1980, scoring 14 tries and also represented the Combined Edinburgh & Glasgow Cities XV against the touring Argentinians and New Zealand All Blacks. He also played for the Co-optimists and the Barbarians

=== International career ===
Forsyth's debut for Scotland was against New Zealand at Murrayfield in Edinburgh on 16 December 1972. He played all four matches in the 1973 Five Nations Championship. He scored a try in Scotland's home victory against Ireland.

His last appearance for Scotland was against the President's XV at Murrayfield on 31 March 1973.

=== Sevens career ===
He was also an accomplished sevens player and by 1980 had winners medals from all the tournaments held in the Borders including of course the prestigious Melrose tournament. He also played for the Co-optimists (Scotland's representatives) at the Hong Kong sevens in 1981.

=== Non-playing career ===
He was Secretary of Stewart's Melville FP RFC from 1983 - 1988 and President in Seasons 1990/91 and 1991/92. He briefly served as a selector for the Edinburgh XV before becoming a selector for the Scotland "A" XV from 1996 to 2003.
