= Hugh MacKintosh =

Hugh Mackintosh CBE
- Full name: Hugh Stewart Mackintosh
- Born: 19 January 1903 Helmsdale, Scotland
- Died: 28 August 1989 (aged 86) Killearn, Scotland

Rugby union career
- Position: Hooker
Amateur team(s)
| Years | Team | Apps | (Points) |
- Glasgow University
Provincial / State sides
| Years | Team | Apps | (Points) |
- West of Scotland District
- Scotland Probables
International career
| Years | Team | Apps | (Points) |
| 1929–32 | Scotland | 16 | (9) |

Hugh Stewart Mackintosh (19 January 1903 — 28 August 1989) was a Scotland international rugby union player.

== Rugby Union career ==
=== Amateur career ===
Born in Helmsdale, Mackintosh was a heavily built hooker who was a strong scrummager and played his club rugby for Glasgow University.

=== Provincial career ===
He represented West of Scotland District in inter–district matches.

He played for Scotland Probables on 19 December 1931.

=== International career ===
Mackintosh made his Scotland debut in 1929. He gained 16 total caps.

Before his final international in 1932, Mackintosh announced his retirement from rugby.

== Business career ==
Mackintosh held a doctorate of education from Aberdeen University and served as Director of Education in Glasgow, for which he was made a Commander of the Order of the British Empire in the 1956 New Year Honours.

== See also ==
- List of Scotland national rugby union players
