= Jimmie Graham =

- Full name: James Graham
- Born: 19 June 1902 Selkirk, Scotland
- Died: 5 September 1986 (aged 84) Kelso, Scotland
- School: Kelso High School
- Occupation: Farmer

Rugby union career
- Position: Wing-forward
International career
Years	Team	Apps	(Points)
1926–32	Scotland	15	(3)

James Graham (19 June 1902 — 5 September 1986) was a Scottish international rugby union player.

Graham was born in Selkirk and educated at Kelso High School.

A Kelso farmer, Graham played his rugby as a wing-forward. He was the first Scotland international to come out of Kelso RFC and played for his country from 1926 to 1932, gaining a total of 15 caps. His early matches were as part of an all-Border back row, beside Hawick RFC players Doug Davies and Willie Welsh. In 1934, Graham captained the Barbarian sevens side to the Twickenham sevens title.

== See also ==
- List of Scotland national rugby union players
