= Christian Melville =

Scottish rugby union player

- Born: Christian Landale Melville; 9 December 1913 Edinburgh, Scotland
- Died: 23 April 1984 (aged 69) Dorset, England

Rugby union career
- Position: Lock
Amateur team(s)
Years	Team	Apps	(Points)
- Black Watch
–	Army		
Provincial / State sides
Years	Team	Apps	(Points)
1938	Scotland Probables		
International career
Years	Team	Apps	(Points)
1937	Scotland	3	(0)

Christian Melville (9 December 1913 – 23 April 1984) was a Scotland international rugby union player.

== Rugby union career ==
=== Amateur career ===
Melville played for the Black Watch and the Army.

=== Provincial career ===
He was supposed to play for the Scotland Probables in the first trial match of season 1937-38. The match due on 18 December 1937 was called off due to frost, despite the contingency of straw being placed on The Greenyards pitch at Melrose. He did however turn out for the Scotland Probables side for the second and final trial match of that season, on 15 January 1938.

=== International career ===
He was capped three times for Scotland, all in 1937.

== Military career ==
Melville was in the Black Watch where he was a Lieutenant Colonel. He was awarded the DSO in 1945.
