= William Blackadder (rugby union) =

Scotland international rugby union player

- Born: William Francis Blackadder; 23 January 1913 Edinburgh, Scotland
- Died: 27 November 1997 (aged 84) Darlington, England

Rugby union career
- Position: Prop
Amateur team(s)
| Years | Team | Apps | (Points) |
| - | Scottish Wayfarers | | |
| – | West of Scotland | | |
| – | Co-Optimists | | |
| – | Newcastle Northern | | |
| – | RAF Rugby | | |
Provincial / State sides
| Years | Team | Apps | (Points) |
| 1938 | Scotland Probables | | |
| 1938-39 | Scotland Possibles | | |
| - | Northumberland | | |
International career
| Years | Team | Apps | (Points) |
| 1938 | Scotland | 1 | (0) |

William Blackadder (2 April 1915 – 16 September 1990) was a Scotland international rugby union player. He played as a wing.

== Rugby union career ==
=== Amateur career ===
In 1933 he was playing for the Scottish Wayfarers.

Blackadder played for West of Scotland.

In April 1938 he played for the representative side Co-Optimists.

He then moved to play for Newcastle Northern.

He also played for the RAF during the second World War.

=== Provincial career ===
Blackadder started for the Scotland Probables side for the second and final trial match of that season, on 15 January 1938. He switched to play for the Scotland Possibles in the second half.

He played for Scotland Possibles in January 1939, then playing for Newcastle Northern.

While he was playing for Newcastle Northern he represented Northumberland county.

=== International career ===
Blackadder was capped by Scotland just the once, in 1938.
