= Maurice Henderson =

Scotland international rugby union player

- Born: Maurice Michael Henderson; 4 April 1913 Musselburgh, Scotland
- Died: 14 October 1989 (aged 76) Bedford, England

Rugby union career
- Position: Prop
Amateur team(s)
Years	Team	Apps	(Points)
- Dunfermline
–	Leicester Tigers		
Provincial / State sides
Years	Team	Apps	(Points)
1937	Midlands District		
1937	North of Scotland District		
1938	Scotland Probables		
1938	Scotland Possibles		
International career
Years	Team	Apps	(Points)
1937	Scotland	3	(0)

Maurice Henderson (4 April 1913 - 14 October 1989) was a Scotland international rugby union player.

== Rugby Union career ==
=== Amateur career ===
He also played club rugby for Dunfermline.

He later played for Leicester Tigers.

=== Provincial career ===
He represented Midlands District in their match against North of Scotland District. Midlands won 8-3 on 6 November 1937.

Henderson then played for North of Scotland District combined side in their match against South of Scotland District on 20 November 1937.

He was then selected for the Scotland Probables side in the trial match against Scotland Possibles. The first trial on 18 December 1937 fell foul of the weather, but Henderson turned out for Probables on 15 January 1938. He didn't impress in the first half and turned out for the Possibles in the second half.

=== International career ===
Henderson was capped 3 times for Scotland in 1937.

== Teaching career ==
Henderson became the Physical Education instructor at Dunfermline High School. He then moved to Bedford to become the Director of Physical Education for Bedfordshire county in England.
