= Jock Allan (rugby union) =

Scotland international rugby union player

- Born: John White Allan; 4 June 1905 Melrose, Scotland
- Died: 29 December 1958 (aged 53) Melrose, Scotland

Rugby union career
- Position: Prop
Amateur team(s)
Years	Team	Apps	(Points)
- Melrose
Provincial / State sides
Years	Team	Apps	(Points)
–	South of Scotland District		
- Scotland Probables
International career
Years	Team	Apps	(Points)
1927-34	Scotland	17	(27)

Jock Allan (4 June 1905 – 29 December 1958) was a Scotland international rugby union player. He was the first married man to play for the Scotland side.

== Rugby Union career ==
=== Amateur career ===
Allan played for Melrose.

He was in the Melrose 7s side that won the Melrose Sevens in 1931.

=== Provincial career ===
He played in the South of Scotland District versus North of Scotland District match of 1931.

He played for Scotland Probables on 19 December 1931.

By 1933 he was dropped by the South of Scotland District side; their team that season were underdogs to beat the North of Scotland District side.

=== International career ===
He was capped 17 times for Scotland from 1927 to 1934.

He made headlines in his cap against Ireland on 24 February 1934 – he was the first married man to play for Scotland.
