= Duncan Shaw (rugby union) =

Scotland international rugby union player

- Born: George Duncan Shaw; 29 May 1915 Galashiels, Scotland
- Died: 14 September 1999 (aged 84) Galashiels, Scotland

Rugby union career
- Position: Prop
Amateur team(s)
Years	Team	Apps	(Points)
-1934	Gala		
1934-	Sale		
Provincial / State sides
Years	Team	Apps	(Points)
1934	South of Scotland District		
1938-39	Scotland Possibles		
International career
Years	Team	Apps	(Points)
- Scotland U16
1935-39	Scotland	6	(7)

Duncan Shaw (29 May 1915 – 14 November 1999) was a Scotland international rugby union player. He played as a Prop.

== Rugby Union career ==
=== Amateur career ===
Shaw was a product of Oundle School and captained the school rugby union side.

Shaw played for Gala before moving to England to play for Sale.

Shaw moved as he was taking up a post in Staffordshire and left Gala at the end of November 1934.

Shaw was noted as a goal-kicking expert.

Shaw hit the headlines for the wrong reason on 25 May 1937 when the Staffordshire Sentinel reported that he was caught speeding by the police and was fined £3 by the court. Shaw had missed the train for an away match and was attempting to hurry and catch his Sale team-mates.

=== Provincial career ===
Shaw was capped for South of Scotland District against North of Scotland District in 1934.

Shaw was supposed to play for the Scotland Possibles in the first trial match of season 1937-38. The match due on 18 December 1937 was called off due to frost despite the contingency of straw being placed on The Greenyards pitch at Melrose. He did however turn out for the Possibles side for the second and final trial match of that season, on 15 January 1938.

Shaw turned out for the Possibles the following year and Shaw's performance was noted as 'full marks' by the Sunday Post of 15 January 1939 in a resounding win for the Possibles side over the Probables. They concluded:

The deciding forwards in the lines were Duncan Shaw and W. H. Crawford. Between them they stole most of the thunder. Shaw’s footwork was a joy to watch, and he was doing more than his share in defence.

=== International career ===
Shaw represented Scotland in schoolboy internationals.

Shaw was capped by Scotland 7 times. His first cap was against the All Blacks in 1935 and he continued representing Scotland until the second world war.

== Military career ==
Shaw joined the 5th North Staffordshire Regiment and was promoted from Captain to Major.
