= John Rogerson (rugby union) =

Scotland international rugby union player

- Born: John Rogerson; 24 July 1874 Bothwell, Scotland
- Died: 7 May 1929 (aged 54) Crieff, Scotland

Rugby union career
- Position: Full Back
Amateur team(s)
Years	Team	Apps	(Points)
- Kelvinside Academicals
Provincial / State sides
Years	Team	Apps	(Points)
1894	West of Scotland District		
International career
Years	Team	Apps	(Points)
1894	Scotland	1	(0)

John Rogerson (24 July 1874 - 7 May 1929) was a Scotland international rugby union player.

== Rugby Union career ==
=== Amateur career ===
Rogerson played rugby union for Kelvinside Academicals.

=== Provincial career ===
He played for West of Scotland District against East of Scotland District on 20 January 1894.

=== International career ===
He was capped once for Scotland, in 1894.
