= William Penman (rugby union) =

Scotland international rugby union player

- Born: William Mitchell Penman; 12 May 1917 Edinburgh, Scotland
- Died: 3 October 1943 (aged 26) Rothwesten, Germany

Rugby union career
- Position: Full Back
Amateur team(s)
Years	Team	Apps	(Points)
- Royal HSFP
- United Services
- RAF
Provincial / State sides
Years	Team	Apps	(Points)
1938	F. J. C. Moffat XV		
1939	East of Scotland District	1	(0)
International career
Years	Team	Apps	(Points)
1939	Scotland	1	(0)
1939	Barbarians	3	(19)

William Penman (12 May 1917 – 3 October 1943) was a Scotland international rugby union player. He was killed in World War II when he, serving as a captain of a Lancaster bomber, was shot down over Kassel.

== Rugby Union career ==
=== Amateur career ===
He was educated at the Royal High School of Edinburgh and then played for Royal HSFP.

He played for United Services.

He joined the RAF in 1935. He played and captained the Royal Air Force Rugby Union team.

=== Provincial career ===
He played for the Scottish selector F. J. C. Moffat's XV against Watsonians in 1938. This was an annual match against Watsonians and looked on as an unofficial trial match.

He played for East of Scotland District against West of Scotland District on 23 December 1939.

=== International career ===
He was capped once for Scotland in 1939, in a match against Ireland. At the time, he was the first Royal HSFP player to be capped for 4 seasons, and the first Royal HSFP player to be capped at Full Back.

He played 3 times for the Barbarians, all in 1939.

== Military career ==
He was a Wing Commander in the 61st squadron of the RAF.

He was awarded the Distinguished Flying Cross and the Air Force Cross.

== Death ==
He was shot down in a night raid. His Lancaster bomber crashed at Rothwesten, north east of Kassel.

He is commemorated at Hanover War Cemetery.

On his death, his widow was left with a 10 month old daughter.

== See also ==
- List of Scottish rugby union players killed in World War II
