= George Horsburgh =

Scotland international rugby union player

- Born: George Brown Horsburgh; 27 October 1910 Stirling, Scotland
- Died: 22 April 1988 (aged 73) London, England

Rugby union career
- Position: Lock
Amateur team(s)
Years	Team	Apps	(Points)
- Stirling HSFP
–	London Scottish		
Provincial / State sides
Years	Team	Apps	(Points)
1938	Scotland Probables		
1938	Scotland Possibles		
International career
Years	Team	Apps	(Points)
1937-39	Scotland	9	(0)

George Horsburgh (27 October 1910 – 10 March 1986) was a Scotland international rugby union player. He played as a Lock.

== Rugby Union career ==
=== Amateur career ===
He first played for Stirling HSFP before moving to London.

He played for London Scottish.

=== Provincial career ===
He was supposed to play for the Scotland Probables in the first trial match of season 1937-38. The match due on 18 December 1937 was called off due to frost despite the contingency of straw being placed on The Greenyards pitch at Melrose. When the second trial match went ahead in January 1938 as planned Horsburgh started for the Probables side. However, in the second half of the match Horsbugh played for Scotland Possibles.

=== International career ===
Horsburgh was capped by Scotland 9 times, all in the period between 1937 and 1939.

=== Administrative career ===
After his playing career ended, he joined the board committee of London Scottish.

== Military career ==
Horsburgh joined the Army.
