= Royal Air Force Rugby Union =

- Founded: 1918

Official website
- www.rafsportsfederation.uk/sports/raf-rugby-union-association/

The Royal Air Force Rugby Union (RAFRU) was formed in 1918 to administer the playing of rugby union in the Royal Air Force. It fields a representative side that competes in the Inter-Services tournament with the Army Rugby Union and the Royal Navy Rugby Union.

== History ==
The founding of the RAFRU relies much on the shoulders of William Wavell Wakefield. He joined the Royal Navy Air Service but on the formation of the Royal Air Force in April 1918 he transferred to them. He was one of the founders of the RAFRU; and in its early years a driving force:- he was a player, captaining the team; a selector; and the secretary of the RAFRU.

He played in 8 Inter-Service matches for the club, captaining the side in all the matches. His last two matches for RAFRU were particularly noteworthy.

The RAFRU played its first Inter-Service match at Twickenham Stadium on 14 February 1923. This was against the Royal Navy Rugby Union. They beat the Navy 3–0 in the match. Another Inter-Service match was organised against the Army Rugby Union on 10 March 1923, again at Twickenham, and again RAFRU were victorious, winning the match 13-5 and becoming Twickenham's Inter-Service champions at the first time of asking.

The RAF-Army match was Wakefield's last match as a player for RAFRU. That same year he was called up to the England squad.

=== 100th Anniversary year ===
2018 became a notable year for the club as they beat both the Army and Navy sides, becoming Inter-Service Champions for the first time since 1994.

== Women's side ==
The RAFRU run a women's side. They compete for the Molly Rose trophy with the women's navy side.

== Veterans side ==
The veterans side is known as the Royal Air Force Vultures.

== Notable former players ==
=== Scotland internationalists ===
The following former RAFRU players have represented Scotland at full international level.

- (Scotland) Angus Black
- (Scotland) William Steele
- (Scotland) Percy Friebe
- (Scotland) Jim Greenwood
- (Scotland) Norman Munnoch
- (Scotland) Roy Kinnear
- (Scotland) William Penman
- (Scotland) Keith Geddes
- (Scotland) George Thom
- (Scotland) William Blackadder
- (Scotland) Ewan Douglas

=== Wales internationalists ===
The following former RAFRU players have represented Wales at full international level.

- (Wales) Willie Davies
- (Wales) Bleddyn Williams
- (Wales) Jeff Young
- (Wales) Sian Williams

=== England internationalists ===
The following former RAFRU players have represented England at full international level.

- (England) William Wakefield
- (England) Don Rutherford
- (England) Paul Hull
- (England) Bob Weighill
- (England) Peter Larter
- (England) John Orwin
- (England) Rory Underwood
- (England) Peter Yarranton
- (England) Josh McNally

=== Ireland internationalists ===
The following former RAFRU players have represented Ireland at full international level.

- (Ireland) George Beamish
