= Allan Roy =

Scotland international rugby union player

- Born: Allan Roy; 13 May 1911 Ainsdale, England
- Died: 16 April 2011 (aged 99) Ainsdale, England
- Height: 1.93 m (6 ft 4 in)

Rugby union career
- Position: Lock
Amateur team(s)
Years	Team	Apps	(Points)
- Waterloo
Provincial / State sides
Years	Team	Apps	(Points)
1938	Scotland Possibles		
International career
Years	Team	Apps	(Points)
1938-39	Scotland	6	(0)

Allan Roy (13 May 1911 – 16 April 2011) was a Scotland international rugby union player. He played as a Lock.

== Rugby Union career ==
=== Amateur career ===
Roy played for the Merseyside club Waterloo.

=== Provincial career ===
He was supposed to play for the Scotland Possibles in the first trial match of season 1937-38. The match due on 18 December 1937 was called off due to frost despite the contingency of straw being placed on The Greenyards pitch at Melrose. He did however turn out for the Possibles side for the second and final trial match of that season, on 15 January 1938.

=== International career ===
Described as: “A great bear of a man”, the 6 ft 4ins second row forward won six international caps. The caps came in 1938, when Scotland won the Triple Crown, and 1939.

== Military career ==
During the second world war Roy joined the Territorial Army in the Liverpool Scottish, then enlisted in the Cameron Highlanders. In 1943 his regiment went to Burma. Roy later joined the Burma Star Association.

== Business career ==
After rugby union and the second world war, Roy launched a successful and varied business career based on his parents' jute hire company. The business was struggling after the second world war but Roy on taking over diversified and saved the business. It ranged from the trade of jute; to then also use other materials to provide plastic netting and paper bags; to running launderettes; and to manufacturing snooker and billiard tables.

== Family ==
The Roy family came from Tayside and had a jute mill in Dundee. His parents moved to Merseyside to open up a sack hire company, using the jute cloth.

Roy had three children, six grandchildren, and 12 great-grandchildren. On his death, his daughter Jeannie said: "He was just a gentle giant, an old-school honourable gentleman. He maintained his sense of humour right to the end. He will be very sorely missed by us all."
