= Tom Reid (rugby union) =

British Lions & Ireland international rugby union player

- Born: Thomas Eymard Reid; 3 March 1926 Limerick, Ireland
- Died: 12 November 1996 (aged 70) Montreal, Canada
- School: Christian Boys' College, Limerick

Rugby union career
- Position: Lock
Senior career
| Years | Team | Apps | (Points) |
| – | Garryowen Football Club | | |
| – | London Irish | | |
International career
| Years | Team | Apps | (Points) |
| 1953–1957 | Ireland | 13 | (0) |
| 1955 | British and Irish Lions | 2 | (0) |

Tom Eymard Reid (3 March 1926 – 12 November 1996) was an Irish rugby union player, who played in the lock position. Reid played club rugby with Garryowen, London Irish and Town of Mount Royal RFC, was capped thirteen times for Ireland, and was a member of the British and Irish Lions team that toured South Africa in 1955.

== Personal life ==
Tom Reid was born on 3 March 1926, in Limerick. His father, Joe Reid had also played rugby for Garryowen and his cousin was the Irish international Paddy Reid. Reid attended the Christian Boys' College in Limerick. As well as playing rugby, Reid also rowed for Limerick Boat Club.

== Rugby career ==
=== Club career ===
Reid made his first appearance for Garryowen in the 1947–48 season. In his debut season, the team won the Munster Senior Cup and Munster Senior League double under captain and cousin Paddy Reid. In the 1949-50 season, Reid was on the Garryowen team that was beaten in the Munster Senior Cup final by UCC, but two years later beat UCC in the final. In the 1953–54 season, Reid captained the team to the Munster Senior Cup, his third and the club's 27th in the competition. Reid later moved to Canada, but made a guest appearance for Garryowen against an Army select side in 1974 while home on holidays.

In September 1954, Reid moved to London and played three seasons with London Irish.

In 1957 Reid toured Canada with the Barbarians and decided to stay. He settled in Montreal and played rugby with Town of Mount Royal RFC alongside another former Garryowen player, Niall Quaid. Reid would become a Canadian rugby pioneer and would play for Montreal All-Stars, the Quebec Representative side and the Eastern Canada All-stars.

== Representative career ==
Reid made his first appearance for Munster in November 1947. He played for Munster for ten years, winning the IRFU Interprovincial Championship in 1947, 1952 and 1954. He played for the Munster representative team in several matches against international opposition; against Australia in 1947, South Africa in 1951 and New Zealand in 1954.

His first appearance for Ireland was in the 1953 Five Nations Championship, against England. In January 1954, against New Zealand, he moved from his usual position at lock to play at Number 8. He returned to lock for subsequent appearances in the 1954 and 1955 Five Nations Championship matches.

Reid was included in the squad for the British Lions tour to South Africa in 1955. During the tour, Reid played in ten tour games against local opposition and two out of the four test matches against the South Africa national team; the second test where he played at Number 8 position and the third test where he reverted to his usual position at lock.

In December 1955, Reid played at Flanker in a combined Scotland & Ireland team that played a combined England & Wales team at Lansdowne Road to mark the opening of the West Upper Stand at the venue. Further appearances for Ireland followed in the 1956 and 1957 Five Nations Championship, the only edition of the championship where Reid played in all four of Ireland's games. His 13th and final game for Ireland came in that championship, against Wales.

Reid also played 14 games for the Barbarians invitational team, including six games on the team's first overseas tour to Canada in 1957. Reid decided to emigrate to Canada following the tour. In 1959, Reid played for Eastern Canada in their match against the British and Irish Lions. As of 2017, he is one of only two players to have played both for and against the Lions.
