= Stewart's College FP =

Former Scottish rugby union club, based in Edinburgh

(Scotland) Stewart's College FP
- Full name: Stewart's College Former Pupils RFC
- Union: Scottish Rugby Union
- Founded: 1875; 151 years ago
- Disbanded: 1973; 53 years ago
- Location: Edinburgh, Scotland
- Ground: Inverleith

Stewart's College FP RFC was a Scottish rugby union club in Edinburgh.

== Founded ==
The club was founded in 1875, when a match took place between the former pupils of Daniel Stewart's Hospital and George Watson's College.

In 1887, the club became a member of the Scottish Rugby Union.

They played at Inverleith Sports Ground, the venue for Scotland's home games between 1899 and 1925, during which time the first match against New Zealand was played. Inverleith still boasts some of the best playing facilities in Edinburgh.

== Merger ==
Daniel Stewart's College merged with Melville's College in 1973. The college's former pupil rugby clubs - Stewart's College FP and Melville College FP - also merged at this time to found a new rugby club: Stewart's Melville FP.

== Notable former players ==
=== Scotland internationalists ===
- (Scotland) Grant Weatherstone
- (Scotland) Bill Agnew
- (Scotland) Bill Relph
- (Scotland) Stephen Wright
- (Scotland) Ernie Anderson
- (Scotland) Ian Forsyth
- (Scotland) James Scott
- (Scotland) Jake Borthwick
- (Scotland) John Buchanan
- (Scotland) Finlay Kennedy
- (Scotland) Gregor Sharp
- (Scotland) John Douglas
- (Scotland) Keith Macdonald
- (Scotland) Mark Stewart

=== Edinburgh District players ===
The following former Stewart's College FP players have represented Edinburgh District at provincial level.

- (Scotland) Grant Weatherstone
- (Scotland) Stephen Wright
- (Scotland) C. Y. Langlands
- (Scotland) G. M. Beaton
- (Scotland) Jake Borthwick
- (Scotland) Keith Macdonald
- (Scotland) J. C. M. Sharp
- (Scotland) J. R. Black
- (Scotland) Ian Forsyth
- (Scotland) Ernie Anderson
- (Scotland) J. A. C. Gilbert
- (Scotland) William Relph
- (Scotland) J. H. Laing
- (Scotland) Bill Agnew
- (Scotland) Mark Stewart
- (Scotland) K. G. Sutherland
- (Scotland) C. Ross
- (Scotland) Finlay Kennedy
- (Scotland) H. Pringle
- (Scotland) Lex Govan

== Honours ==
- Melrose Sevens
  - Champions (2): 1920, 1956
- Langholm Sevens
  - Champions (4): 1948, 1951, 1957, 1965
- Hawick Sevens
  - Champions (3): 1937, 1952, 1959
- Gala Sevens
  - Champions (1): 1952
- Jed-Forest Sevens
  - Champions (5): 1934, 1946, 1948, 1959, 1960
- Heriots Sevens
  - Champions: 1950
