= James Woodburn =

Scotland international rugby union player

- Born: James Cowan Woodburn; 21 April 1870 Glasgow, Scotland
- Died: 1 May 1903 (aged 33) Glasgow, Scotland

Rugby union career
- Position: Three-Quarters
Amateur team(s)
Years	Team	Apps	(Points)
- Kelvinside Academicals
Provincial / State sides
Years	Team	Apps	(Points)
- Glasgow District
International career
Years	Team	Apps	(Points)
1892	Scotland	1	(0)

James Woodburn (21 April 1870 – 1 May 1903) was a Scotland international rugby union player. He played at Three-Quarters

== Rugby Union career ==
=== Amateur career ===
Woodburn played for Kelvinside Academicals.

=== Provincial career ===
Woodburn played for Glasgow District against Edinburgh District in the 17 December 1892 Inter-City match. This was in the middle of an unbeaten spell in the Inter-City for Glasgow; and Glasgow District won the match by 1 goal & 1 try to 3 tries (in an era when goals were predominate over tries).

=== International career ===
Woodburn played one match for Scotland. This was the Home Nations match against Ireland at Raeburn Place, Edinburgh on 20 February 1892. Scotland won the match 2 - 0.
