= Archibald Drummond =

Scotland international rugby union player

- Born: Archibald Hugh Drummond; 2 April 1915 Glasgow, Scotland
- Died: 16 September 1990 (aged 75) Jedburgh, Scotland

Rugby union career
- Position: Wing
Amateur team(s)
Years	Team	Apps	(Points)
-	Kelvinside Academicals		
Provincial / State sides
Years	Team	Apps	(Points)
1937	Glasgow District		
1938	Scotland Probables		
International career
Years	Team	Apps	(Points)
1938	Scotland	2	(6)

Archibald Drummond (2 April 1915 – 16 September 1990) was a Scotland international rugby union player. He played as a wing.

== Rugby Union career ==
=== Amateur career ===
Drummond played for Kelvinside Academicals.

=== Provincial career ===
Drummond was capped for Glasgow District. He shone in the inter-city match against Edinburgh District on 4 December 1937. He scored 1 try, 2 conversions and 3 penalties in the match, helping Glasgow to an emphatic 29 - 6 victory.

He was supposed to play for the Scotland Probables in the first trial match of season 1937-38. The match due on 18 December 1937 was called off due to frost despite the contingency of straw being placed on The Greenyards pitch at Melrose. He did however turn out for the Scotland Probables side for the second and final trial match of that season, on 15 January 1938.

=== International career ===
Drummond was capped by Scotland twice. Both caps came in 1938.
