= Robert Gallie =

Robert Gallie MC
- Full name: Robert Arthur Gallie
- Born: 18 January 1893 Glasgow, Scotland
- Died: 25 May 1948 (aged 55) Edinburgh, Scotland
- School: Glasgow Academy; Fettes College
- Notable relative: George Gallie (son)

Rugby union career
- Position: Hooker
International career
Years	Team	Apps	(Points)
1920–21	Scotland	8	(0)

Robert Arthur Gallie (18 January 1893 — 25 May 1948) was a Scottish international rugby union player.

Born in Glasgow, Gallie was educated at Glasgow Academy and later Fettes College, where received the "Challenge Clock" as the school's best all-round athlete. He played rugby for Glasgow Academicals.

Gallie served with distinction as a captain in the 1st Glasgow Yeomanry during World War I. In 1918, Gallie was awarded both the Croix de Guerre and Military Cross. He was also mentioned in dispatches six times.

When rugby returned after the war, Gallie gained eight Scotland caps as a hooker, playing all matches of their 1920 and 1921 Five Nations campaigns, after which he disappeared from the scene.

Gallie had three sons, two of whom were killed in World War II, including rugby international George Gallie.

== See also ==
- List of Scotland national rugby union players
