= David Thom =

Scotland international rugby union player

David Alexander Thom
- Born: David Alexander Thom; 14 February 1910 Hawick, Scotland
- Died: c.1 December 1981 (aged 71) Wandsworth, London, England
- Height: 5 ft 11 in (1.80 m)
- Weight: 79 kg (12 st 6 lb; 174 lb)

Rugby union career
- Position: Flanker
Amateur team(s)
Years	Team	Apps	(Points)
1927	Hawick Y.M.		
1927-29	Hawick		
1929-	London Scottish		
Provincial / State sides
Years	Team	Apps	(Points)
1927	South of Scotland District		
1929	Anglo-Scots		
International career
Years	Team	Apps	(Points)
1934-35	Scotland	5	(3)

79th President of the Scottish Rugby Union
- In office 1965–1966
- Preceded by: Ross Logan
- Succeeded by: Mark Stewart

David Thom (14 February 1910 – December 1981) was a Scotland international rugby union player. He became the 79th President of the Scottish Rugby Union.

== Rugby Union career ==
=== Amateur career ===
Thom was playing for the Hawick Y.M.C.A. side, Hawick Y.M., before then playing for Hawick.

He was still playing for Hawick right at the start of the 1929–30 season when he was a reserve for the Hawick side for the Kelso Sevens.

His last game for Hawick was on 26 October 1929 where he contributed in a fine victory over Selkirk.

Thom moved to London for work and then played for London Scottish.

He was one of the famous London Scottish 'live wires'.

In October 1933, a notable London Scottish win over Blackheath hit the headlines. More remarkable than the win was the versatility of Thom. The London Scottish scrum half George McLaren broke a bone in his wrist and couldn't continue. To the surprise of the crowd it was Thom who then filled in at scrum half. The Edinburgh Evening News reported:

Thom tackled the job like an expert. Not only did he sling the ball out in the approved manner but he surprised his international vis-a-vis E. B. Pope by 'dummying' his way through on more than one occasion.

He was one of the London Scottish sevens side that reached the final of the 1937 Melrose Sevens, only to be beaten by Gala by a last minute score.

=== Provincial career ===
He was picked for the South of Scotland District against Edinburgh District for their junior match on 26 February 1927.

He was picked for the Anglo-Scots side to play the combined North and South district on 21 December 1929.

Thom played the match. The Anglo-Scots were beaten 14–13.

=== International career ===
He was capped 5 times for Scotland in the period 1934–35.

=== Administrative career ===
He became the 79th President of the Scottish Rugby Union. He served the standard one year from 1965 to 1966.

== Outside of rugby union ==
He worked in London for Peter Scott & Co. Ltd, a hosiery manufacturer.
