= William Inglis (rugby union) =

Scotland international rugby union player

- Born: William Murray Inglis; 20 January 1915 Town Yetholm, Scotland
- Died: 22 April 1988 (aged 73) London, England

Rugby union career
- Position: Prop
Amateur team(s)
Years	Team	Apps	(Points)
- Cambridge University
–	Royal Engineers		
–	London Scottish		
Provincial / State sides
Years	Team	Apps	(Points)
1939	Scotland Probables		
International career
Years	Team	Apps	(Points)
1937-38	Scotland	6	(0)

William Inglis (20 January 1915 – 22 April 1988) was a Scotland international rugby union player. He played as a prop.

== Rugby Union career ==
=== Amateur career ===
Inglis played for Cambridge University and after university joined the army and played rugby union for the Royal Engineers.

He later moved to play for London Scottish.

=== Provincial career ===
He was supposed to play for the Scotland Probables in the first trial match of season 1937-38. The match due on 18 December 1937 was called off due to frost despite the contingency of straw being placed on The Greenyards pitch at Melrose. When the second trial match went ahead in January 1938 as planned, Inglis was not picked - due to injury - either for the Probables side or the Scotland Possibles side. Inglis place in the Probables side was taken by W. F. Blackadder, who was due to play in the Possibles side instead. It was noted that Inglis had sprained his ankle on a holiday to Switzerland a fortnight before the trial.

Indeed, it was noted that Inglis received his first call-up to the Scotland side without playing a match in Scotland; either for a club side or a district or trial side. He was scheduled to play in a trial side two years before but a torn muscle hindered this; and he was not even able to play in Scotland with Cambridge University when they played Scottish teams on tour.

He finally managed to play for Scotland Probables in January 1939, then playing club rugby for London Scottish. However G.D. Shaw eclipsed Inglis's performance and Inglis received no more Scotland caps.

=== International career ===
Inglis was capped by Scotland 6 times, all in the period between 1937 and 1938.

== Military career ==
Inglis was a Lieutenant in the Royal Engineers.

== Death ==
He died at his home on 22 April 1988 in the Sunnyside district of Wimbledon in London.
