= Jock Waters =

British Lions & Scotland international rugby union player

- Born: John Alexander Waters; 11 November 1908 Musselburgh, Scotland
- Died: 29 September 1990 (aged 81) Selkirk, Scotland

Rugby union career
- Position: No. 8
Amateur team(s)
Years	Team	Apps	(Points)
1925-	Selkirk		
Provincial / State sides
Years	Team	Apps	(Points)
1931	South of Scotland District		
1938	Scotland Probables		
International career
Years	Team	Apps	(Points)
1933-37	Scotland	16	(0)
1938	British and Irish Lions	1	(0)

Jock Waters (11 November 1908 - 29 September 1990) was a Scotland international rugby union player. He also played one match for the British and Irish Lions. His regular playing position was Number 8.

== Rugby Union career ==
=== Amateur career ===
Waters played for Selkirk.

=== Provincial career ===
Waters first played for the South of Scotland District in November 1931.

The Southern Reporter of 26 November 1931 noted his debut:

Since he joined the team [Selkirk] six seasons ago the Souter captain has held a place in the first XV consistently, and for some time past all who know his worth have felt that a trial was overdue. He must very nearly the heaviest end tallest forward the Borders, if does not head the list, and he is an excellent man in every department of the forward game. Apart from his great personal popularity, is a great leader for the Selkirk pack and excellent skipper. His appearance Saturday, therefore, was the tit-bit of the trial so far as Selkirk was concerned. Some may have been disappointed with his form, but judged from the point of view of solid worth, and not superficial flashiness, fully justified his selection. One feels, however. that was not at his best. The game played, though, was one which did not tend to catch the eye, for he was always in the thick of things and a hard worker throughout, the result being that did not figure in the spectacular type of game which often gives an erroneous impression of a forward’s worth. The South backs were the scoring department at Philiphaugh. and the forwards' job was therefore to do the grinding work for which recognition is often meagre. Waters has certainly merited future trial by his sterling display.

Waters was supposed to play for the Scotland Probables in the first trial match of season 1937-38. The match due on 18 December 1937 was called off due to frost despite the contingency of straw being placed on The Greenyards pitch at Melrose. He did however turn out for the Scotland Probables side for the second and final trial match of that season, on 15 January 1938.

=== International career ===
Waters made 16 international appearances for Scotland.

Waters was on the 1936 British Lions tour to Argentina but not used. He later went on the 1938 British Lions tour to South Africa, playing in one match.
