= Fletcher Buchanan =

Scotland international rugby union player

- Born: Fletcher Gordon Buchanan; 23 December 1889 Glasgow, Scotland
- Died: 24 May 1960 (aged 70) Dollar, Clackmannanshire, Scotland
- University: Oxford University

Rugby union career
- Position: Centre
Amateur team(s)
Years	Team	Apps	(Points)
- Kelvinside Academicals
–	Oxford University		
–	Kelvinside Academicals		
Provincial / State sides
Years	Team	Apps	(Points)
1911	Whites Trial		
International career
Years	Team	Apps	(Points)
1910-11	Scotland	3	(0)

Fletcher Buchanan (23 December 1889 – 24 May 1960) was a Scotland international rugby union player. He played as a Centre.

== Rugby Union career ==
=== Amateur career ===
Buchanan played for Kelvinside Academicals.

On studying at Oxford University he then played for Oxford University.

After studying at Oxford, he returned to Glasgow and played for Kelvinside Academicals once more. He captained the side.

The Scottish Referee, 20 November 1911, said this of Buchanan:

one of the best three-quarters who played for Oxford last season has improved since he returned to the land of his birth, but it is a fact, and to-day the Kelvinside captain is one of the finest players behind the scrummage we have in Scotland. His displays in recent matches have shattered the opinion that he was only a fair weather sailor. He is more than that; he is a most excellent defensive player, besides being an aggressive artist of the premier type - Buchanan is a great exponent of the carrying game, and we hope this season to find him adorned with that emblem which only falls to the lot of a selected few.

=== Provincial career ===
He played for the Whites Trial side against the Blues Trial side on 21 January 1911, while still with Oxford University.

=== International career ===
He played for Scotland three times, selected in 1910 and 1911.
