= Ross Sutherland RFC =

Scottish rugby union club, based in Invergordon

- Full name: Ross Sutherland Rugby Football Club
- Union: Scottish Rugby Union
- Nickname: The Stags (First XV)
- Founded: 1923
- Ground(s): Naval Grounds, Invergordon
- President: (Scotland)
- Coach: (Scotland) David Kennedy/Ali Kennedy
- Captain: (Scotland)
- League: Caledonia North Conference
- 2024–25: Caledonia North Two, 8th of 8
1st kit	2nd kit

Official website
- www.pitchero.com/clubs/rosssutherlandrfc

Ross Sutherland RFC is a rugby union club based in Invergordon, in Easter Ross in the Highlands of Scotland. The first XV play in Caledonia North Conference.

The club also runs a number of junior sides and has a well-established mini rugby section for Primary school children.

== History ==
As rugby made its way north it took hold in Inverness in the early 1920s. Shortly afterwards a Ross and Sutherland contingent broke away to form Ross Sutherland RFC. Records begin in 1927 although the club may have been running a few years earlier. The club spent some time in Dingwall and Strathpeffer before coming to the Naval Grounds in Invergordon where they have one of the finest pitches in the north of Scotland and excellent facilities. The club's most famous player were Duncan Macrae who played for Scotland and the British Lions on the 1938 tour of South Africa. Ross Sutherland nominates players to represent the club at regional level as part of the SRU pathway programme yearly.

In 2017/18 Ross Sutherland won the National bowl at Murrayfield Stadium. After previously winning the Caledonian Regional Bowl.
