= Johnny Johnston (rugby union) =

Scotland international rugby union player

- Born: William Graham Stuart Johnston; 31 May 1913 London, England
- Died: 4 October 1994 (aged 81) Surrey, England

Rugby union career
- Position: Wing
Amateur team(s)
Years	Team	Apps	(Points)
- Cambridge University
–	Richmond		
Provincial / State sides
Years	Team	Apps	(Points)
1938	Scotland Possibles		
International career
Years	Team	Apps	(Points)
1935-37	Scotland	5	(0)

Johnny Johnston (31 May 1913 - 4 October 1994) was a Scotland international rugby union player.

== Rugby Union career ==
=== Amateur career ===
Johnston played for Cambridge University and then Richmond.

=== Provincial career ===
He played for the Scotland Possibles side against the Scotland Probables side in the final trial match of the 1937-38 season to determine international selection. He scored a try in a 23–13 win for the Possibles side.

=== International career ===
He was capped 5 times for Scotland, between 1935 and 1937.
