= Doddie Wood =

- Full name: George Wood
- Born: 19 April 1905 Galashiels, Scotland
- Died: 25 November 1989 (aged 84) Galashiels, Scotland

Rugby union career
- Position: Centre / Wing
Amateur team(s)
Years	Team	Apps	(Points)
- Gala Star
1924-35	Gala		
Provincial / State sides
Years	Team	Apps	(Points)
1931	South of Scotland District		
1931	Scotland Probables		
International career
Years	Team	Apps	(Points)
1931–32	Scotland	5	(3)

George "Doddie" Wood (19 April 1905 — 25 November 1989) was a Scotland international rugby union player.

== Rugby Union career ==
=== Amateur career ===
Born in Galashiels, Wood was a three-quarter and came through the Gala Star junior side. He won the Hawick Junior Football League Sevens with Gala Star in 1924, scoring in the semi-final. Gala Star beat Gala in the final. He was part of the side that were finalists of their own tournament, the Gala Star Sevens in 1925. Gala Star was beaten by Walkerburn.

He then spent his remaining club career with Gala RFC from the end of 1924, although Gala Star initially caused a stir by declining to give Gala their players, and Wood and another player Harkness for a time returned to Star before it was resolved in the senior club's favour.

The Edinburgh Evening News of Friday 26 September 1924 noted Wood's arrival:

Much is expected of George Wood, a product of Gala Star, who has played well in the seven-a-sides, and who promises to be a valuable asset to Gala. He is a brainy player, whose style reminds one of W. E. Bryce. Wood is being tried at centre three-quarter, but he is equally good in the stand-off half position.

Wood made his first notable appearance for Gala in the 1926 Kelso Sevens. He won the Scottish Unofficial Championship with Gala in season 1931-32.

He was part of the Gala side that won the Kelso Sevens in 1931, and the Jed-Forest Sevens and Melrose Sevens in 1932.

He retired from playing rugby in 1935, only to be persuaded back in 1940 when the club was light of players during the Second World War.

=== Provincial career ===
He played for South of Scotland District against North of Scotland District in the match of 21 November 1931. South won 30 points to 9, with Wood scoring a try at the end of the match.

He played for Scotland Probables in 19 December 1931 playing at Centre, scoring a try in the match.

=== International career ===
He was capped five times over his two years playing for Scotland, the first two on the wing, before switching to the centre during the 1932 Home Nations.

=== Administrative career ===
Retiring in 1935, Wood remained involved in rugby as a selector, first for Gala and then for the South of Scotland District. He stood for election to the SRU but was defeated by Hawick's Andrew Bowie.

== Business career ==
He served his apprenticeship at the pattern shop of the Ovens and Shaws Mill.

Wood served in the Royal Air Force at the outbreak of World War II. He then became a PE teacher at James Clark School in Edinburgh and was later employed by Scottish Brewers until retirement.

== Other interests ==
He was a noted sprinter and was made honorary vice-president of the Gala Harriers. He won the Ibrox Sprint in the 1920s which was the top amateur race in Scotland at the time.

== See also ==
- List of Scotland national rugby union players
