= Grant Weatherstone =

Scotland international rugby union player (1931–2020)

- Born: Thomas Grant Weatherstone; 27 June 1931 Edinburgh, Scotland
- Died: 2 January 2020 (aged 88)

Rugby union career
- Position: Wing
Amateur team(s)
Years	Team	Apps	(Points)
- Stewart's College FP
Provincial / State sides
Years	Team	Apps	(Points)
- Edinburgh District
International career
Years	Team	Apps	(Points)
1952-59	Scotland	16	(9)

Grant Weatherstone (27 June 1931 – 2 January 2020) was a Scotland international rugby union player. Weatherstone played as a winger.

== Rugby union career ==
=== Amateur career ===
Weatherstone played for Stewart's College FP.

=== Provincial career ===
Weatherstone represented Edinburgh District.

=== International career ===
He was capped for Scotland 16 times from 1952 to 1959.
