= Norman Munnoch =

Scottish rugby union player (1929–2023)

- Born: Norman McQueen Munnoch; 4 January 1929 Polmont, Scotland
- Died: 6 November 2023 (aged 94) Burlington, Ontario, Canada
- School: George Watson's College
- University: University of Edinburgh
- Occupation: Anaesthesiologist

Rugby union career
- Position: Hooker
Amateur team(s)
Years	Team	Apps	(Points)
- Watsonians
–	RAFRU		
Provincial / State sides
Years	Team	Apps	(Points)
- Edinburgh District
International career
Years	Team	Apps	(Points)
1952	Scotland	3	(0)

Norman McQueen Munnoch (4 January 1929 – 6 November 2023) was a Scottish international rugby union player. He played as a hooker.

== Rugby union career ==
=== Amateur career ===
Norman played for the Watsonians.

He also played for the RAF rugby union team.

=== Provincial career ===
Norman played for Edinburgh District in the 1950-51 Inter-City match against Glasgow District on 2 December 1950. Glasgow won the Inter-City 11 pts to 3 pts.

Norman played for Edinburgh District in the 1951-52 Inter-City match against Glasgow District on 1 December 1951. Glasgow won the Inter-City 6 pts to 3 pts.

=== International career ===
He was capped for Scotland three times in 1952, all of the caps coming in the Five Nations matches. Norman was capped for the following matches:

1. Scotland vs. France at Murrayfield (12 January 1952)
2. Scotland vs. Wales at Cardiff (2 February 1952)
3. Scotland vs. Ireland at Lansdowne Road (23 February 1952)

== Death ==
Norman died on November, 6th, 2023 at the age of 94.
