= Charles Grieve =

British Lions & Scotland international rugby union player & cricketer

- Born: Charles Frederick Grieve; 1 October 1913 Manila, Rizal, Philippines
- Died: 1 June 2000 (aged 86) Ludlow, England

Rugby union career
- Position: Full Back
Amateur team(s)
Years	Team	Apps	(Points)
–	Oxford University		
–	Duke of Wellington Regiment		
Provincial / State sides
Years	Team	Apps	(Points)
1938	Scotland Probables		
International career
Years	Team	Apps	(Points)
1935–38	Scotland	2	(0)
1938	British and Irish Lions	2	(4)
- Cricket career

Cricket information
- Batting: Right-handed

Domestic team information
- Years: Team
- 1936: Oxford University

Career statistics
Competition	First-class
Matches	1
Runs scored	8
Batting average	4.00
100s/50s	0/0
Top score	6
Balls bowled	30
Wickets	0
Bowling average	–
5 wickets in innings	–
10 wickets in match	–
Best bowling	–
Catches/stumpings	1/–
- Source: ESPNcricinfo, 28 February 2011

Major Charles Frederick Grieve (1 October 1913 in Manila, Philippines – 1 June 2000 in Ludlow, Shropshire, England) was a Scotland international rugby union player. He was also a cricketer for Guernsey and Oxford University. He became a career soldier.

== Early life ==
Grieve was born in Manila in the Philippines, where his father worked for the family rubber exporting company. He was educated in England at Ampleforth College and went on to study history at Christ Church, Oxford.

== Rugby Union career ==
Grieve played club rugby with Oxford University. In the first trial match his team was listed as the Duke of Wellington's Regiment.

He was supposed to play for the Scotland Probables in the first trial match of season 1937-38. The match due on 18 December 1937 was called off due to frost despite the contingency of straw being placed on The Greenyards pitch at Melrose. He turned out for the Scotland Probables side for the second and final trial match of that season, on 15 January 1938.

=== International career ===
Grieve was capped for Scotland against Wales in 1935. He was also on the 1938 British Lions tour to South Africa. Late in the final Test in Durban, he scored a drop goal to give the Lions victory.

== Cricket career ==
Grieve was a right-handed batsman. He represented Ampleforth on the 1st XI.

At Oxford University, he represented the university cricket club in a single first-class match against Derbyshire in 1936. In 1934, he had played for Guernsey against the Marylebone Cricket Club in a non-first-class fixture. Opening the batting in Guernsey's first-innings, he scored a century.

== Military career ==
In World War II, Grieve served in the King's African Rifles in Abyssinia and the Far East. After the war, he transferred to the Duke of Wellington's Regiment and in 1952 went as a company commander to the fighting in Korea. He later served in Gibraltar, and served the rest of his career looking after the physical training of soldiers.

== Personal life ==
Grieve married Joy Ellis in 1946; they had five children. Joy died in 1997; he died in 2000, aged 86.
