= Archibald Symington =

Scotland international rugby union player

- Born: Archibald William Symington; 20 March 1892 Calcutta, India
- Died: 8 May 1941 (aged 48–49) North Connel, Scotland
- School: Fettes College
- University: Cambridge University

Rugby union career
- Position(s): Lock, Second-row
Amateur team(s)
Years	Team	Apps	(Points)
- Cambridge University RUFC
–	London Scottish F.C.		
International career
Years	Team	Apps	(Points)
1914	Scotland	2	

Archibald William Symington (20 March 1892 – 8 May 1941) was a Scottish international rugby union player, who was killed in World War II.

He was capped twice for Scotland in 1914 at lock/second row. He also played for Cambridge University RFC.

== See also ==
- List of Scottish rugby union players killed in World War II

== Sources ==
- Bath, Richard (ed.) The Scotland Rugby Miscellany (Vision Sports Publishing Ltd, 2007 ISBN 1-905326-24-6)
- Massie, Allan A Portrait of Scottish Rugby (Polygon, Edinburgh; ISBN 0-904919-84-6)
