= Charles France (rugby union) =

Scotland international rugby union player

- Born: Charles France; 11 February 1879 Lenzie, East Dunbartonshire, Scotland
- Died: 18 October 1946 (aged 67) Scone, Scotland

Rugby union career
- Position: Wing
Amateur team(s)
| Years | Team | Apps | (Points) |
- Kelvinside Academicals
Provincial / State sides
| Years | Team | Apps | (Points) |
- Glasgow District
International career
| Years | Team | Apps | (Points) |
| 1903 | Scotland | 1 | (0) |

Charles France (11 February 1879 – 18 October 1946) was a Scotland international rugby union player

== Rugby union career ==
=== Amateur career ===
France played for Kelvinside Academicals.

=== Provincial career ===
He was capped by Glasgow District in 1898; scoring a try in the Inter-City match against Edinburgh District.

=== International career ===
He was capped just the once for the Scotland international side, turning out against Ireland in 1903.
