= 1930–31 Scottish Districts season =

Rugby union competition

- Countries: Scotland
- Date: 1930–31
- Matches played: 1

The 1930–31 Scottish Districts season is a record of all the rugby union matches for Scotland's district teams.

== History ==
Glasgow District beat Edinburgh District in the Inter-City match.

== Results ==
Date	Try	Conversion	Penalty	Dropped goal	Goal from mark	Notes
1905–1947	3 points	2 points	3 points	4 points	3 points	

=== Inter-City ===
6 December 1930

Glasgow District	9 – 6	Edinburgh District
Try: R. Murdoch; Max Simmers; J. M. Dykes	Report	Pen: B. R. Tod x 2

Old Anniesland
Attendance: 10,000
Referee: Willie Burnet (Hawick)

Glasgow District: H. F. Gormley (West of Scotland), R. Murdoch (Hillhead HSFP), W. G. Stewart (Glasgow HSFP), Max Simmers (Glasgow Academicals), James Forrest (Glasgow Academicals), Ian Shaw (Glasgow HSFP), Jimmy Nelson (Glasgow Academicals), G. C. Langlands (Glasgow HSFP), W. A. Macpherson (Glasgow HSFP), G. C. Scott (Glasgow Academicals), J. Stewart (Glasgow HSFP), L. M. Stuart (Glasgow HSFP), J. M. Dykes (Kelvinside Academicals), G. W. Cres (Glasgow Academicals), R. Rowand (Glasgow HSFP)
Edinburgh District: J. L. Tod (Edinburgh Academicals), G. R. Gunn (Royal HSFP), William Emslie (Royal HSFP), G. P. R. Macpherson (Edinburgh Academicals), D. P. Henshaw (Watsonians), B. R. Tod (Edinburgh Academicals), W. R. Logan (Edinburgh University), J. R. Thom (Watsonians), R. Allan (Watsonians), R. J. Henderson (Edinburgh Academicals), A. R. Lamb (Institution), M. S. Stewart (Stewart's College), W. C. C. Agnew (Stewart's College), A. Porter (Royal HSFP), W. Wood (Leith Academicals)

=== Other Scottish matches ===
8 November 1930
2.30pm

North of Scotland District	0 – 25	Midlands District
	Report	Try: A. W. Wilson; George Ritchie x 2 J. Carmichael; J. S. Fraser; Con: A. H. M. Hutton x 5

St. Machar Drive, Aberdeen
Referee: J. L. Fiddes (Merchiston and Aberdeen GSFP)

North of Scotland District: J. M. M'Leod (Aberdeen Grammar School F.P.'s); A. W. Mac Donald (Moray). R. S. Bateman (Moray) A. B. Donald (Aberdeen University), and D. W. Brown (Aberdeen University); G. W. Bowes (A.G.F.P.s) and C. M. Murray Aberdeen University); R. Bain (A.G.F.P.s) W. A. Barclay (Gordonians), J. A. Freeland (Gordonians), J. B. Gill (Aberdeen University), D. Middleton (Aberdeen University), J. A. Morrice (A.G.F.P.s), G. Stroud (Aberdeenshire), and J. Trail (A.G.F.P-s).
Midlands District: A. H. M. Hutton (Dunfermline), J. McMichen (St Andrews), N. Lindsay (Waid Academy F.P.), A. W. Wilson (captain), and C. H, Brown (Dunfermline); M. Lind (Dunfermline) J. Carmichael (St Andrews); J. Bald (Dunfermline), J. S. Fraser (Dunfermline), J. McFadzen (Dundee H.S.F.P.), J. R. Ness (Dunfermline), G. Oglivie (Panmure), George Ritchie (Dundee H.S.F.P.), J. S. Wilson (St Andrew's), and J. W. A. Wright (Panmure).

22 November 1930

North of Scotland District	v	South of Scotland District
	Preview; Report

North of Scotland District:
South of Scotland District:

20 December 1930

Provinces District	12 - 14	Anglo-Scots
	Preview; Preview; Report; Report

Provinces District:
Anglo-Scots:

=== Trial matches ===
10 January 1931

Scotland Probables	v	Scotland Possibles
	Preview; Report

Probables:
Possibles:

=== English matches ===
No other District matches played.

=== International matches ===
No touring matches this season.
