= Wilf Crawford =

Scotland international rugby union player

- Born: Wilfrid Hornby Crawford; 24 August 1915 Rochester, Kent, England
- Died: 6 June 1993 (aged 77) Haddington, Scotland

Rugby union career
- Position: Flanker
Amateur team(s)
Years	Team	Apps	(Points)
- United Services
–	Royal Navy		
Provincial / State sides
Years	Team	Apps	(Points)
1938	Scotland Possibles		
1938	Scotland Probables		
International career
Years	Team	Apps	(Points)
1938-39	Scotland	5	(21)

Wilf Crawford (24 August 1915 – 6 June 1993) was a Scotland international rugby union player. He played as a flanker. He later was a noted horse-racing trainer.

== Rugby Union career ==
=== Amateur career ===
Wilf Crawford played for the Portsmouth club United Services.

He also played for the Royal Navy.

=== Provincial career ===
He played for the Scotland Possibles side against the Scotland Probables side in the final trial match of the 1937-38 season to determine international selection. He impressed the selectors in the first half and then turned out for the Probables in the second half.

=== International career ===
Crawford was capped by Scotland 5 times. The caps came in 1938, when Scotland won the Triple Crown, and 1939.

== Horse-racing career ==
After his rugby union career finished Crawford became a noted horse-racing trainer. He began training horses from his farm in Haddington mainly for personal friends.

He was interviewed by the Daily Mirror in 1966 on the effect of the Betting Tax on the horse-racing industry:

"I really think the situation is gloomy. It may mean smaller fields, leading to smaller prizes, fewer spectators, a breeding recession, fewer owners, and the closing of more courses."

== Military career ==
Crawford was a Sub-Lieutenant in the Royal Navy.
