= 1919–20 Scottish Districts season =

Rugby union competition

- Countries: Scotland
- Date: 1919–20
- Matches played: 1

The 1919–20 Scottish Districts season is a record of all the rugby union matches for Scotland's district teams.

== History ==
Edinburgh District beat Glasgow District in the Inter-City match.

== Results ==
Date	Try	Conversion	Penalty	Dropped goal	Goal from mark	Notes
1905–1947	3 points	2 points	3 points	4 points	3 points	

=== Inter-City ===
6 December 1919

Glasgow District	3 – 19	Edinburgh District
	Report

Hamilton Crescent, Glasgow
Referee: John Dykes

Glasgow District:
Edinburgh District:

=== Other Scottish matches ===
6 December 1919

Midlands District	10 – 9	North of Scotland District
	Report

Forthill

Midlands District:
North of Scotland District:

13 December 1919

South of Scotland District	15 – 8	North of Scotland District
	Report; Report; Report

Galashiels

South of Scotland District:
North of Scotland District:

20 December 1919

Cities District	13 – 16	Provinces District
	Preview; Report

Inverleith

Cities District:
Provinces District:

=== Trial matches ===
10 January 1920

Scotland Probables	19 – 5	Scotland Possibles
	Preview; Preview; Report

Scotland Probables:
Scotland Possibles:

=== English matches ===
No other District matches played.

=== International matches ===
No touring matches this season.
