= George Crerar =

Scottish cricketer and rugby union player

- Born: George Graham Crerar; 1 October 1914 Glasgow, Scotland
- Died: 6 December 1986 (aged 72) Worthing, England

Rugby union career
- Position: Centre
Amateur team(s)
Years	Team	Apps	(Points)
- Glasgow Academicals
Provincial / State sides
Years	Team	Apps	(Points)
1937	Glasgow District		

83rd President of the Scottish Rugby Union
- In office 1969–1970
- Preceded by: Bill Nicholson
- Succeeded by: Robert Wilson Shaw
- Cricket career

Cricket information
- Batting: Right-handed
- Bowling: Slow left-arm orthodox

International information
- National side: Scotland

Domestic team information
- Years: Team
- 1947–1948: Scotland

Career statistics
Competition	First-class
Matches	2
Runs scored	76
Batting average	19.00
100s/50s	0/0
Top score	36
Catches/stumpings	1/–
- Source: Cricinfo, 17 April 2020

George Crerar (1 October 1914 – 6 December 1986) was a Scotland international cricketer. He was also a Scottish rugby union player. He was the 83rd President of the Scottish Rugby Union.

== Rugby Union career ==
=== Amateur career ===
He played for Glasgow Academicals.

=== Provincial career ===
He played for Glasgow District in the 1937 inter-city match.

=== Administrative career ===
He became the 83rd President of the Scottish Rugby Union. He served the standard one year from 1969 to 1970.

== Cricket career ==
Crerar played cricket for Glasgow Academicals. He also represented the Scotland international side.
