= 1938 Home Nations Championship =

International rugby union competition

- Date: 15 January - 19 March 1938
- Countries: England; Ireland; Scotland; Wales

Tournament statistics
- Champions: Scotland (11th title)
- Triple Crown: Scotland (8th title)
- Matches played: 6

The 1938 Home Nations Championship was the thirty-fourth series of the rugby union Home Nations Championship. Including the previous incarnations as the Five Nations, and prior to that, the Home Nations, this was the fifty-first series of the northern hemisphere rugby union championship. Six matches were played between 15 January and 19 March. It was contested by England, Ireland, Scotland and Wales. Scotland won their 12th title, also winning the Triple Crown and the Calcutta Cup.

== Participants ==
The teams involved were:

Nation	Venue	City	Captain
England	Twickenham	London	Herbert Toft/Peter Cranmer
Ireland	Lansdowne Road	Dublin	George Morgan/Sam Walker
Scotland	Murrayfield	Edinburgh	Wilson Shaw
Wales	National Stadium/St. Helen's	Cardiff/Swansea	Cliff Jones

== Table ==
Pos	Team	Pld	W	D	L	PF	PA	PD	Pts
1	Scotland	3	3	0	0	52	36	+16	6
2	Wales	3	2	0	1	31	21	+10	4
3	England	3	1	0	2	60	49	+11	2
4	Ireland	3	0	0	3	33	70	−37	0

== Results ==
1938-01-15

Wales	14–8	England

Cardiff

1938-02-05

Scotland	8–6	Wales

Edinburgh

1938-02-12

Ireland	14–36	England

Dublin

1938-02-26

Scotland	23–14	Ireland

Edinburgh

1938-03-12

Wales	11–5	Ireland

Swansea

1938-03-19

England	16–21	Scotland

London
