= William Renwick (rugby union) =

Scotland international rugby union player

- Born: William Norman Renwick; 29 November 1914 Edinburgh, Scotland
- Died: 15 June 1944 (aged 29) Bolsena, Italy

Rugby union career
- Position: Wing
Amateur team(s)
Years	Team	Apps	(Points)
- Edinburgh Wanderers
Provincial / State sides
Years	Team	Apps	(Points)
- Edinburgh District
1938	Scotland Possibles		
International career
Years	Team	Apps	(Points)
1938-39	Scotland	2	(6)

William Norman Renwick (29 November 1914 – 15 June 1944) was a Scotland international rugby union player, who was killed in World War II at Bolsena.

== Rugby Union career ==
=== Amateur career ===
He played for Edinburgh Wanderers and London Scottish FC.

=== Provincial career ===
He represented Edinburgh District.

He played for the Scotland Possibles side in their trial match against the Scotland Probables on 15 January 1938.

=== International career ===
He was capped twice for Scotland between 1938 and 1939, scoring two tries.

== See also ==
- List of Scottish rugby union players killed in World War II
