= Kelvinside Academicals RFC =

Defunct Scottish rugby union club, based in Glasgow

Coordinates: 55.886938°N 4.310243°W

(Scotland) Kelvinside Academicals
- Full name: Kelvinside Academicals Rugby Football Club
- Union: Scottish Rugby Union
- Founded: 1888
- Disbanded: 1982; 44 years ago
- Location: Glasgow, Scotland

Kelvinside Academicals is a former rugby union team that played their home games at Balgray Playing Fields, Glasgow, Scotland.

The team was founded in 1888 by former pupils of the Kelvinside Academy. The team no longer exists.

In 1982 it merged with Glasgow HSFP - the rugby team of another school; the High School of Glasgow - to form a rugby club called Glasgow High Kelvinside.

In 1997, the 1st XV of Glasgow High Kelvinside merged with the 1st XV of Glasgow Academicals to form Glasgow Hawks. Both GHK and Academicals survived the merger as individual clubs - Academicals now compete in SRU National League 1 - just below Hawks - while GHK are at the next level down, National League 2.

In 2018 Glasgow Hawks relocated to Balgray from Old Anniesland to play their games there in the Tennent's Premiership as part of a new partnership with Kelvinside Academy. Hawks now train at Craigholme School's Sports Complex in Pollok Park.

== History ==
Founded in 1888, Kelvinside Academy Former Pupils formed a rugby club.

Throughout the 1890s they were noted for a fast open style of play.

The club played at various locations in the Anniesland area until the early years of the Twentieth Century.

For a short period after the Second World War, Kelvinside Academicals joined with West of Scotland to form a new club Kelvinside-West.

== Sevens tournament ==
Kelvinside Academicals first hosted a rugby sevens tournament in 1922. It was re-started in 1974 playing for the Minerva Cup. The Kelvinside Academicals Sevens ended when the club merged with Glasgow HSFP.

=== Past winners ===
- 1981 (England) Gosforth
- 1980 (England) Gosforth
- 1979 West of Scotland
- 1978 West of Scotland
- 1977 (Scotland) Hillhead
- 1976 (Scotland) Glasgow Academicals
- 1975 (Scotland) Melrose
- 1974 (Scotland) Hillhead
- 1922 (Scotland) Glasgow HSFP

== Notable former players ==
=== Scotland internationalists ===
The following former Kelvinside Accies players have represented Scotland at full international level.

- (Scotland) Fletcher Buchanan
- (Scotland) Archibald Drummond
- (Scotland) Charles France
- (Scotland) John Rogerson
- (Scotland) James Greenlees
- (Scotland) J. Knox
- (Scotland) George A.W. Lamond
- (Scotland) Vivian Weston
- (Scotland) D.M. White
- (Scotland) James Woodburn

=== Glasgow District ===
The following former Kelvinside Accies players have represented Glasgow District at provincial level.

- (Scotland) A.G. Campbell
- (Scotland) M.R. White
- (Scotland) J. Knox
- (Scotland) J.W. Nairn
- (Scotland) J.M. Dykes
- (Scotland) I. McLashlan
- (Scotland) James Greenlees
- (Scotland) G. Wingate
- (Scotland) W.B. Wilson
- (Scotland) James Woodburn
- (Scotland) Vivian Weston
- (Scotland) Charles France
- (Scotland) W.G. France
- (Scotland) T. Neill

== Honours ==
- Bearsden Sevens
  - Champions: 1976, 1982
- Cambuslang Sevens
  - Champions: 1978
- Kilmarnock Sevens
  - Champions: 1933
- Stirling Sevens
  - Champions: 1965
- Cartha Sevens
  - Champions: 1972, 1973
