= Robert Dryden (rugby union) =

Scotland international rugby union player

- Born: Robert Hunter Dryden; 10 January 1918 Edinburgh, Scotland
- Died: 14 March 1996 (aged 78) Edinburgh, Scotland

Rugby union career
- Position: Wing
Amateur team(s)
Years	Team	Apps	(Points)
-	Watsonians		
–	Army		
Provincial / State sides
Years	Team	Apps	(Points)
1937	Scotland Possibles		
1938	Scotland Probables		
International career
Years	Team	Apps	(Points)
1937	Scotland	1	(0)

Robert Dryden (10 January 1918 – 14 March 1996) was a Scotland international rugby union player. He played as a wing.

== Rugby Union career ==
=== Amateur career ===
Dryden played for Watsonians.

In a notable game against Kelso the Watsonian wing scored all four tries for his side, The Scotsman newspaper of 8 February 1937 noting:

Dryden was an outstanding performer, the young Watsonian "flier" scoring all his sides four tries, his closing move being the result of a brilliant effort from his own half of the field. It can truly be said that it was Dryden's speed which gave the visitors the substantial victory, the home lot having no one in their ranks to keep in touch with him.

He played for Watsonians in the 1939 Melrose Sevens tournament. They were up against Heriots in the first round, with John Craig, Dryden's erstwhile opponent facing up against him. Heriots won through and won the tournament in that year.

He was included in the Army team of 1941.

=== Provincial career ===
Dryden played for Scotland Possibles in January 1937.

Dryden turned out for the Scotland Probables side for the second and final trial match of that season, on 15 January 1938. He was injured after the first ten minutes and was replaced by N.A. Gillanders of Panmure. Dryden sustained a small but deep cut in his head which required a stitch and heavy bandaging.

He had several trial matches. His biggest rival for international selection was noted as John Craig from Heriots F.P.

He was belatedly called up for East of Scotland District against the West of Scotland District in 1939 when G.H. Caithness called off. Dryden was home on leave at the time. The Edinburgh Evening News thought that the East's chances relied on Dryden's readiness:

The success of the East backs will depend a great deal on whether or not J. R. S. Innes and R. H. Dryden have been getting enough Rugby to "keep their eye in." It is not likely that the Watsonian internationalist has been playing much, for he has been in the Army since the outbreak of war. For some time Dryden has been undergoing a special training course in the South along with W. R. C. Brydon, Heriot’s F.P. The West have got together as powerful a side as possible, and it should be a more interesting game than the Myreside affair.

Despite his late call-up, Dryden himself had to pull out of selection. His Watsonian team-mate E.C. Hunter stepped in and performed well. The East beat the West by a single point in a 7–6 win.

He was due to play for the East of Scotland District against the West of Scotland District in 1942 but was replaced by E.C.K. Douglas in the starting line-up.

=== International career ===
Dryden was capped by Scotland once. He played against England at Murrayfield in 1937.

He was called up when Scotland had selection issues at wing.
