= Peter Tait (rugby union) =

Scotland international rugby union player

- Born: Peter Webster Tait; 19 October 1906 Edinburgh, Scotland
- Died: 22 April 1980 (aged 73) Edinburgh, Scotland

Rugby union career
- Position: Hooker
Amateur team(s)
| Years | Team | Apps | (Points) |
- Royal HSFP
Provincial / State sides
| Years | Team | Apps | (Points) |
| 1937 | Edinburgh District | | |
| 1938 | Scotland Probables | | |
International career
| Years | Team | Apps | (Points) |
| 1935 | Scotland | 1 | (0) |

Peter Tait (19 October 1906 – 22 April 1980) was a Scotland international rugby union player.

== Rugby Union career ==
=== Amateur career ===
Tait played for Royal HSFP.

=== Provincial career ===
Tait was capped for Edinburgh District.

He was supposed to play for the Scotland Probables in the first trial match of season 1937-38. The match due on 18 December 1937 was called off due to frost despite the contingency of straw being placed on The Greenyards pitch at Melrose. He did however turn out for the Scotland Probables side for the second and final trial match of that season, on 15 January 1938.

=== International career ===
Tait played in only one match for Scotland, in 1935 against England at Murrayfield.
