= Charles Dick (rugby union) =

Scotland international rugby union player

- Born: Robert Charles Stewart Dick; 26 July 1913 Sevenoaks, England
- Died: 10 May 2004 (aged 90) Christchurch, New Zealand

Rugby union career
- Position: Centre
Amateur team(s)
Years	Team	Apps	(Points)
- Guy's Hospital
Provincial / State sides
Years	Team	Apps	(Points)
1938	Scotland Probables		
International career
Years	Team	Apps	(Points)
1934-38	Scotland	14	(18)

Charles Dick (26 July 1913 – 10 May 2004) was a Scotland international rugby union player. He played as a centre.

== Rugby Union career ==
=== Amateur career ===
Dick played rugby union for Guy's Hospital.

=== Provincial career ===
He was supposed to play for the Scotland Probables in the first trial match of season 1937-38. The match due on 18 December 1937 was called off due to frost despite the contingency of straw being placed on The Greenyards pitch at Melrose. He did however turn out for the Scotland Probables side for the second and final trial match of that season, on 15 January 1938.

=== International career ===
Dick was capped by Scotland 14 times, and captained the side.

Having taken an appointment at Windsor, Dick pulled out of international rugby in 1939, informing the SRU that he could not continue due to business reasons.

The Scotsman noted his absence from the international side:

It will be noted with some dismay amongst Scottish Rugby followers that R. C. S. Dick is an absentee. Dick, not only a great defensive player but a possessor of brilliant touches and a running swerre without equal in Rugby football at the moment, has had business engagements that have made his availability doubtful and there must be fears now that he will not play again for Scotland.

== Medical career ==
He was a doctor. After the Second World War he emigrated to New Zealand. He became the Queen's Honorary Physician in 1958; and was appointed as the medical superintendent of the Princess Margaret Hospital in Christchurch.
