= 1957 Barbarians tour of Canada =

Summary
P	W	D	L
Total
6	6	0	0
Test match
0	0	0	0

The 1957 Barbarians tour of Canada was a series of rugby matches played in April and May 1957 in Canada by Barbarian F.C. and local teams.

The tour was announced in October 1956 by the tours committee of the home Rugby union, with selection and management of the team to be carried out by Barbarians. They were to depart following a tour of Wales. The amateur all-star squad of top players from UK clubs arrived in Toronto on 25 April for a 2 1/2-week tour.

It was an historic tour, the first outside Great Britain for the invitational club.

Following a party on their last night, Barbarians member Tom Reid missed the return flight to Britain and stayed in Montreal for two decades.

== Results ==
27 April 1957

Ontario	3–47	Barbarians

Toronto

30 April 1957

Ontario	0–52	Barbarians

Toronto

4 May 1957

British Columbia	6–19	Barbarians

Vancouver

8 May 1957

British Columbia	8–51	Barbarians

Victoria

11 May 1957

British Columbia	3–17	Barbarians

Empire Stadium, Vancouver

14 May 1957

Quebec	3–41	Barbarians

Montreal
