= Ross Logan =

Scottish rugby union and cricketer

- Born: William Ross Logan; 24 November 1909 Edinburgh, Scotland
- Died: 26 October 1993 (aged 83) Edinburgh, Scotland
- School: Merchiston Castle School
- University: University of Edinburgh

Rugby union career
- Position: Scrum-half
Amateur team(s)
Years	Team	Apps	(Points)
- Edinburgh University RFC
–	Edinburgh Wanderers		
Provincial / State sides
Years	Team	Apps	(Points)
1931	Edinburgh District		
1931-38	Scotland Probables		
International career
Years	Team	Apps	(Points)
1931-1937	Scotland		

78th President of the Scottish Rugby Union
- In office 1964–1965
- Preceded by: Herbert Waddell
- Succeeded by: David Thom

William Ross Logan (24 November 1909 – 26 October 1993) was a Scottish international rugby union and cricket player.

== Rugby Union career ==
=== Amateur career ===
He attended Merchiston Castle School, where he captained the school team for three successive seasons. He also played for Edinburgh University RFC, and Edinburgh Wanderers, captaining the latter at one point.

=== Provincial career ===
He was capped by Edinburgh District for the 1931 inter-city match.

He played for Scotland Probables on 19 December 1931.

Ross turned out for the Scotland Probables side for the second and final trial match of the 1937-38 season, on 15 January 1938.

=== International career ===
He was capped for Scotland between 1931 and 1937. He was only capped once in 1931 whilst still a student playing for Edinburgh University, in the game against England.

He captained Scotland in the 1937 match between Scotland and Wales at Swansea, and like V.I. Rees, the Welsh captain, played for Edinburgh Wanderers. (Scotland won 13–6)

One contemporary description of Logan says "[he] plays a characteristic hard game and is a past master in both defence and attack."

=== Administrative career ===
He became the 76th President of the Scottish Rugby Union. He served the standard one year from 1964 to 1965.

== Cricket career ==
He also played for the Scotland national cricket team.

== See also ==
- List of Scottish cricket and rugby union players
