= Bill Agnew =

Scotland international rugby union player

- Born: William Craigie Agnew; 15 April 1910 Glasgow, Scotland
- Died: 27 March 1961 (aged 50) London, England

Rugby union career
- Position: Lock
Amateur team(s)
Years	Team	Apps	(Points)
- Stewart's College FP
Provincial / State sides
Years	Team	Apps	(Points)
- Edinburgh District
International career
Years	Team	Apps	(Points)
1930	Scotland	2	(0)

Bill Agnew (14 April 1910 – 27 March 1961) was a Scotland international rugby union footballer. He played for Stewart's College FP at the Lock position.

== Rugby Union career ==
=== Amateur career ===
Agnew played for Stewart's College FP at the Lock position.

=== Provincial career ===
Agnew represented Edinburgh District. He played in the 1930 Inter-City match against Glasgow District.

=== International career ===
Agnew played for Scotland twice.

He played in two matches of the 1930 Five Nations tournament.

He made his debut against Wales on 1 February 1930 at Murrayfield Stadium Scotland won that match 12 - 9. He second and final appearance was against Ireland at Murrayfield Stadium on 22 February 1930. Ireland won that match 14 - 11.
