= Kelvinside-West =

Defunct Scottish rugby union club, based in Glasgow

(Scotland) Kelvinside-West
- Full name: Kelvinside-West Rugby Football Club
- Union: Scottish Rugby Union
- Founded: 1945
- Disbanded: 1951; 75 years ago
- Location: Glasgow, Scotland

Kelvinside-West is a former rugby union team that played their home games at Balgray Playing Fields, Glasgow, Scotland.

Kelvinside-West was a short-lived rugby union club based on the merger of Kelvinside Academicals and West of Scotland.

== History ==
The team was founded in 1945 after the Second World War in a bid to regroup and once again kick start rugby union in Glasgow.

The main drivers of the merger were West of Scotland who found themselves out of a home after being evicted by the West of Scotland Cricket Club who played at Hamilton Crescent, their old ground.

In 1951–52 season both Kelvinside Academicals and West of Scotland became strong enough to once again have their own teams and the merger ended.

== Notable former players ==
=== Scotland internationalists ===
The following former Kelvinside-West players have represented Scotland at full international level.

- (Scotland) Bob Taylor
- (Scotland) William Cowie

=== Glasgow District ===
The following former Kelvinside-West players have represented Glasgow District at provincial level.

- (Scotland) Bob Taylor
- (Scotland) R. B. Walker
- (Scotland) Tom Neill
- (Scotland) William Cowie
- (Scotland) J. S. Ure
- (Scotland) Frank Hogarth
- (Scotland) G. C. Mackie
- (Scotland) S. W. Hill
- (Scotland) S. R. F. Miller
- (Scotland) A. G. M. Watt

== Honours ==
- Greenock Sevens
  - Champions: 1948
