= Ernie Anderson (rugby union) =

Scotland international rugby union player

- Born: Ernest Anderson; 20 October 1918 Edinburgh, Scotland
- Died: 27 January 2001 (aged 82)

Rugby union career
- Position: Scrum-half
Amateur team(s)
Years	Team	Apps	(Points)
- Stewart's College FP
Provincial / State sides
Years	Team	Apps	(Points)
- Edinburgh District
International career
Years	Team	Apps	(Points)
1947	Scotland	2	(0)

Ernie Anderson (20 November 1918 – 27 January 2001) was a Scotland international rugby union player.

== Rugby Union career ==
He played for Stewart's College FP.

He represented Edinburgh District.

He was capped twice for Scotland in 1947.
