= James Wilson (rugby union, born 1909) =

James Wilson CBE
- Full name: James Stewart Wilson
- Born: 4 September 1909 Dundee, Scotland
- Died: 30 April 1994 (aged 84) Haverfordwest, Wales
- School: High School of Dundee
- University: University of St Andrews
- Occupation: Doctor / RAF officer

Rugby union career
- Position: Back row
International career
Years	Team	Apps	(Points)
1931–32	Scotland	5	(0)

Air commodore James Stewart Wilson (4 September 1909 — 30 April 1994) was a Royal Air Force officer and Scotland international rugby union player.

Born in Dundee, Wilson attended the High School of Dundee and studied medicine at the University of St Andrews, where he captained the first XV. He was a powerfully-built forward, gaining five Scotland caps over two years, which included a Calcutta Cup win in 1931.

Wilson obtained his medical degree in 1933 and after a brief period as a surgeon at Dundee Royal Infirmary was posted to Aden with the Royal Air Force. He later became an Air commodore.

== See also ==
- List of Scotland national rugby union players
