= George Gallie =

Scotland international rugby union player

- Born: George Holmes Gallie; 9 September 1917 Edinburgh, Scotland
- Died: 16 January 1944 (aged 26) Minturno, Italy

Rugby union career
- Position: Prop
Amateur team(s)
Years	Team	Apps	(Points)
- Edinburgh Academicals
Provincial / State sides
Years	Team	Apps	(Points)
- Edinburgh District
International career
Years	Team	Apps	(Points)
1939	Scotland	1	(0)

George Holmes Gallie (17 September 1917 – 16 January 1944) was a Scotland international rugby union player, who played at prop.

== Rugby Union career ==
=== Amateur career ===
He played for Edinburgh Academicals RFC.

=== Provincial career ===
He was capped for Edinburgh District.

=== International career ===
He was capped once for Scotland in 1939.

== Death ==
Gallie, a major in the British Army, was killed in the Second World War at Minturno, Italy, during the First Battle of Monte Cassino in January 1944. He was serving with the 78th (Lowland) Field Regiment of the Royal Artillery at the time of his death.

== Family ==
He was the son of Capt Robert Arthur Gallie, MC, (1893-1948), who represented Scotland at hooker in 1920 and 1921.

== See also ==
- List of Scottish rugby union players killed in World War II
