= Vivian Weston =

Scotland international rugby union player

- Born: Vivian George Weston; 22 May 1914 Glasgow, Scotland
- Died: 7 May 1979 (aged 64) Glasgow, Scotland
- Notable relative(s): Jamie Weston, grandson

Rugby union career
- Position: Flanker
Amateur team(s)
Years	Team	Apps	(Points)
- Kelvinside Academicals
–	British Army		
Provincial / State sides
Years	Team	Apps	(Points)
- Glasgow District
International career
Years	Team	Apps	(Points)
1936	Scotland	2	(0)

Vivian Weston (22 May 1914 – 7 May 1979) was a former Scotland international rugby union player. He played at Flanker but could also fill in at Lock.

== Rugby Union career ==
=== Amateur career ===
Weston played for Kelvinside Academicals.

In the Second World War, Weston enlisted in the British Army. He played for the Army rugby union side against France on 1 January 1945, turning out as a Lock.

=== Provincial career ===
Weson played for Glasgow District against Edinburgh District in the Inter-City match of 5 December 1936. Glasgow won the match 11 - 3, with Weston and his Kelvinside Academical teammate I. McLachlan combining to set up Robert Wilson Shaw for a try. The Glasgow Herald noted that Weston was one of the Forwards in the match that may have impressed the Scotland selectors.

=== International career ===
He was capped for Scotland twice in 1936. He made his debut in the Home Nations match against Ireland on 22 February 1936 and made his final appearance against England on 21 March 1936.

== Family ==
His grandson Jamie Weston became a professional rugby union player turning out for Glasgow Warriors, Edinburgh and the Border Reivers.
