= Ian Shaw (rugby union) =

Scotland international rugby union player

- Born: John Shaw; 3 August 1911 Glasgow, Scotland
- Died: 5 June 1973 (aged 61) Glasgow, Scotland
- Notable relative(s): Wilson Shaw, brother

Rugby union career
- Position: Centre
Amateur team(s)
Years	Team	Apps	(Points)
- Glasgow HSFP
Provincial / State sides
Years	Team	Apps	(Points)
- Glasgow District
- Scotland Probables
International career
Years	Team	Apps	(Points)
1937	Scotland	1	(4)

Ian Shaw was a Scotland international rugby union player.

== Rugby Union career ==
=== Amateur career ===
He played for Glasgow HSFP.

=== Provincial career ===
He was capped for Glasgow District. Shaw played at Fly-half in the 1930 inter-city match.

He played for Scotland Probables in 19 December 1931 playing at Centre.

=== International career ===
He was capped once for Scotland in 1937. He scored a drop goal in the match against Ireland.

== Family ==
His brother Wilson Shaw was also capped for Scotland.
