= Harry Lind =

Scotland international rugby union player

- Born: Harry Lind; 27 March 1906 Dunfermline, Scotland
- Died: 18 December 1986 (aged 80) Dunfermline, Scotland

Rugby union career
- Position: Fly-half / Centre
Amateur team(s)
Years	Team	Apps	(Points)
- Dunfermline
Provincial / State sides
Years	Team	Apps	(Points)
- Midlands District
- Scotland Probables
International career
Years	Team	Apps	(Points)
1928–1936	Scotland	16	(7)
Refereeing career
Years	Competition		Apps
1944	Scottish Districts		

Harry Lind (27 March 1906 – 18 December 1986, Dunfermline) was a Scotland international rugby union player.

== Rugby Union career ==
=== Amateur career ===
His club was Dunfermline RFC.

=== Provincial career ===
Lind represented the Midlands District.

He played for Scotland Probables on 19 December 1931.

=== International career ===
He was capped 16 times for Scotland between 1928 and 1936 at centre.

In Scotland's Triple Crown win in 1933, when they beat Ireland 8-6 by two drop-goals (four points each in those days) to two tries (three points in those days), Lind contributed the winning goal:

"Ireland were pressing on the Scottish line and leading by 6-4 when suddenly the Scottish forwards ignited a foot-rush from their own line to the Irish '25'. Davy was one who had to go in to try and stop the rush and when he got up, there was Harry Lind of Dunfermline slotting the winning drop-goal. 'It was some foot-rush', I remember that great Irishman saying, 'Forwards really could control the dribble in those days."

=== Referee career ===
After his playing career, Lind became a rugby union referee.
