= John Craig (rugby union) =

Scotland international rugby union player

- Born: John Binnie Craig; 7 December 1918 Calcutta, Bengal Presidency, British India (present-day Kolkata, West Bengal, India)
- Died: 21 July 1976 (aged 57) Edinburgh, Scotland

Rugby union career
- Position: Wing
Amateur team(s)
Years	Team	Apps	(Points)
- Heriot's
Provincial / State sides
Years	Team	Apps	(Points)
- Edinburgh District
International career
Years	Team	Apps	(Points)
1939	Scotland	1	(0)

John Craig (7 December 1918 – 21 July 1976) was a Scotland international rugby union player.

== Rugby Union career ==
=== Amateur career ===
He played for Heriot's.

=== Provincial career ===
He was capped for Edinburgh District.

=== International career ===
He was capped once for Scotland.
