= Jock Beattie =

Scotland international rugby union player

- Born: John Armstrong Beattie; 5 January 1907 Hawick, Scotland
- Died: 10 February 1977 (aged 70) Hawick, Scotland

Rugby union career
- Position: Lock
Amateur team(s)
Years	Team	Apps	(Points)
- Hawick Linden
- Hawick
- Co-Optimists
Provincial / State sides
Years	Team	Apps	(Points)
- South of Scotland District
1938	Scotland Possibles		
1938	Scotland Probables		
International career
Years	Team	Apps	(Points)
1929–36	Scotland	23	(0)
- Barbarians

Jock Beattie (5 January 1907 – 10 February 1977) was a Scotland international rugby union player.

== Rugby Union career ==
=== Amateur career ===
Beattie played for Hawick Linden.

He then played for Hawick.

He played for the Co-Optimists.

=== Provincial career ===
Beattie captained the South of Scotland District side.

He played for the Scotland Possibles side against the Scotland Probables side in the final trial match of the 1937-38 season to determine international selection. He impressed the selectors in the first half and then turned out for the Probables in the second half.

=== International career ===
He played for Scotland 23 times in the period 1929 to 1936.

He also represented the Barbarians.
