= D. K. A. MacKenzie =

Scotland international rugby union player

Donald Mackenzie
- Born: Donald Kenneth Andrew Mackenzie; 30 November 1916 Edinburgh, Scotland
- Died: 12 June 1940 (aged 23) Edinburgh, Scotland

Rugby union career
- Position: Number 8
Amateur team(s)
Years	Team	Apps	(Points)
- Edinburgh Wanderers
Provincial / State sides
Years	Team	Apps	(Points)
- Edinburgh District
International career
Years	Team	Apps	(Points)
1939	Scotland	2	(0)

Donald Kenneth Andrew MacKenzie (30 November 1916 – 12 June 1940, Edinburgh) was a Scotland international rugby union player.

== Rugby Union career ==
=== Amateur career ===
His home club was Edinburgh Wanderers.

=== Provincial career ===
He was capped for Edinburgh District.

=== International career ===
He played for Scotland twice at number eight in the 1939 Home Nations Championship.

== Death ==
He was the first Scottish rugby internationalist to be killed in World War II. He died in June 1940 when his Spitfire crashed near Edinburgh during a training flight.

== See also ==
- List of Scottish rugby union players killed in World War II
