= James Forrest (rugby union) =

Scotland international rugby union player

- Born: James Edminston Forrest; 3 February 1907
- Died: 2 April 1981 (aged 74)

Rugby union career
- Position: Wing
Amateur team(s)
Years	Team	Apps	(Points)
- Glasgow Academicals
Provincial / State sides
Years	Team	Apps	(Points)
- Glasgow District
International career
Years	Team	Apps	(Points)
1932-35	Scotland	3	(0)

James Forrest (3 February 1907 – 2 April 1981) was a Scotland international rugby union player.

== Rugby Union career ==
=== Amateur career ===
He played for Glasgow Academicals.

=== Provincial career ===
He was capped for Glasgow District.

=== International career ===
He was capped three times for Scotland.
