= Jake Borthwick =

Scotland international rugby union player

- Born: Jake Bishop Borthwick; 29 July 1912 Edinburgh, Scotland
- Died: 25 November 2008 (aged 96) Galashiels, Scotland

Rugby union career
- Position: Prop
Amateur team(s)
Years	Team	Apps	(Points)
- Stewart's College FP
Provincial / State sides
Years	Team	Apps	(Points)
- Edinburgh District
International career
Years	Team	Apps	(Points)
1938	Scotland	2	(0)

Jake Borthwick (29 July 1912 – 25 November 2008) was a Scotland international rugby union player.

== Rugby Union career ==
=== Amateur career ===
He played for Stewart's College FP.

=== Provincial career ===
He represented Edinburgh District.

=== International career ===
He was capped twice for Scotland in 1938.
