= Tom Dorward =

Scotland international rugby union player

- Born: Thomas Fairgrieve Dorward; 27 March 1916 Galashiels, Scotland
- Died: 5 March 1941 (aged 24) Castle Bytham, England
- Notable relative(s): Arthur Dorward, brother

Rugby union career
- Position: Scrum half
Amateur team(s)
Years	Team	Apps	(Points)
-	Gala		
Provincial / State sides
Years	Team	Apps	(Points)
1937	South of Scotland District		
1938	Scotland Possibles		
International career
Years	Team	Apps	(Points)
1938-39	Scotland	5	(0)

Thomas Fairgrieve Dorward (27 March 1916, Galashiels – 5 March 1941, Castle Bytham, Lincolnshire) was a Scotland international rugby union player. He died as the result of wounds received during World War II.

== Rugby Union career ==
=== Amateur career ===
He played for Gala.

=== Provincial career ===
He played for South of Scotland District in their match against the combined North of Scotland District on 20 November 1937.

He was scheduled to play for the Scotland Probables side in the December 1937 trial match but the match was called off due to frost. Instead, Dorward was later in the January 1938 trial, this time as a substitute for the Scotland Possibles side. He came on in the second half.

=== International career ===
He was capped five times for Scotland between 1938 and 1939.

== Death ==
Pilot Officer Dorward was killed whilst serving with the RAF in World War II.

== Family ==
His brother Arthur Dorward was also capped for Scotland.

== See also ==
- List of Scottish rugby union players killed in World War II
