= George Roberts (rugby union) =

Scotland international rugby union player

- Born: George Roberts; 13 February 1914 Edinburgh, Scotland
- Died: 2 August 1943 (aged 29) Kanchanaburi, Thailand

Rugby union career
- Position: Full Back
Amateur team(s)
| Years | Team | Apps | (Points) |
- Watsonians
Provincial / State sides
| Years | Team | Apps | (Points) |
- Edinburgh District
| 1938 | Scotland Possibles | | |
International career
| Years | Team | Apps | (Points) |
| 1938-39 | Scotland | 5 | (0) |

George Roberts (13 February 1914 – 2 August 1943) was a Scotland international rugby union player, who died working on the Burma-Siam Railway at Kanchanaburi in Thailand.

== Rugby Union career ==
=== Amateur career ===
He played for Watsonians.

=== Provincial career ===
He represented Edinburgh District.

He played for Scotland Possibles in their trial match against Scotland Probables in January 1938, coming on as a substitute in the second half.

=== International career ===
He was capped five times for Scotland between 1938 and 1939.

== See also ==
- List of Scottish rugby union players killed in World War II
