= Robert Wilson Shaw =

Scotland international rugby union player

Wilson Shaw
- Born: Robert Wilson Shaw; 11 April 1913
- Died: 23 July 1979 (aged 66) Glasgow, Scotland

Rugby union career
- Position(s): Fly-half, wing, centre
Amateur team(s)
Years	Team	Apps	(Points)
- Glasgow HSFP
Provincial / State sides
Years	Team	Apps	(Points)
- Glasgow District
1935	Cities District		
1938	Scotland Possibles		
International career
Years	Team	Apps	(Points)
1934–39	Scotland	19	(28)
1936	British and Irish Lions	0	(0)
–	Barbarians		
- Correct as of 2007-12-23

84th President of the Scottish Rugby Union
- In office 1970–1971
- Preceded by: George Crerar
- Succeeded by: Alex Brown

Robert Wilson Shaw CBE (11 April 1913 – 23 July 1979) was a Scottish rugby union footballer who played for Scotland in 19 tests between 1934 and 1939.

== Rugby Union career ==
=== Amateur career ===
Shaw played club for Glasgow HSFP and could play in several positions in the backline; including wing, centre and fullback.

Seasoned player and journalist J.B.G. Thomas wrote of Glasgow High School FP fly-half Wilson Shaw "I cannot ever remember seeing an outside half with greater speed off the mark than Shaw."

=== Provincial career ===
Shaw was capped for Glasgow District.

Shaw also played the All Blacks in 1935 with the Cities District

He was supposed to play for the Scotland Probables in the first trial match of season 1937-38. The match due on 18 December 1937 was called off due to frost despite the contingency of straw being placed on The Greenyards pitch at Melrose. He did however turn out for the Scotland Possibles side for the second and final trial match of that season, on 15 January 1938.

=== International career ===
Shaw's playing qualities were considered somewhat of an enigma. He was fast, could run well, could pass and dummy pass, and could sidestep many defenders. However Shaw was considered a flawed genius due to his inconsistency. Whilst he was without equal on his day, he could also produce performances equally as poor. The weakest technical aspect of his game was considered his kicking, and his defence could also be poor. Despite this, following the Triple Crown winning victory over England in 1938, the press proclaimed him "the greatest rugby player of his generation".

Richard Bath writes:

"Shaw was so consistently outstanding at fly-half that became Scotland's regular No. 10, eventually becoming captain and leading Scotland to the Triple Crown in 1938."

==== Scotland ====
He first represented Scotland in 1934 when he played all three of her Home International Championship matches (against England, Ireland, and Wales). He scored his first try in the Calcutta Cup match against England that year. He is most famous however for guiding Scotland to their Triple Crown victory over England at Twickenham in 1938. Shaw's performance was central to Scotland's 21–16 victory and he was carried off the field on the shoulders of his team-mates. The match became known as "Wilson Shaw's match". In 2002 Shaw was inducted into the Scottish Sports Hall of Fame.

===== 1938 Triple Crown =====
Shaw participated in all three of Scotland's Championship matches in 1938. The first was against Wales which Scotland won 8–6 on 5 February. Although Scotland only scored one try to Wales two, their superior kicking gave them the victory.

Their next match was against Ireland on 26 February, and again Scotland won—this time 23–14. Shaw had a good game, although he did not score any tries.

The last match of the Championship was against England at Twickenham Stadium on 19 March. The match was played in front of 70,000 spectators. This was also the first ever rugby international to be televised. Shaw scored one try in the first half, and Scotland led 12–9 at the break. In the second half Scotland frequently penetrated the England defence. Shaw came close several times to scoring a second try, before three minutes from full-time to help Scotland to a 21–16 win. Scotland had outscored England five tries to one, and Shaw was widely credited with inspiring the win. The match became known as "Wilson Shaw's match".

Since France was still banned from the competition at this stage, this would have been the nearest thing to a Scottish Grand Slam.

==== British and Irish Lions ====
Shaw was selected for the British and Irish Lions team that toured Argentina in 1936. Although no caps were awarded for the tour, Shaw was part of the one Test of the tour, a 23-0 victory over Argentina.

=== Administrative career ===
He became the 84th President of the Scottish Rugby Union. He served the standard one year from 1970 to 1971.

== Family ==
His brother Ian Shaw was also a Scotland international rugby union player.
