= List of Scotland national rugby union players =

This is a list of Scottish national rugby union players, i.e. those who have played for the Scotland national rugby union team. The list only includes players who have played in a Test match.

In 2023, the Scottish Rugby Union made the decision to award caps to 56 players who only took part in 23 games which had not been considered full tests (during or just after the Second World War, and against emerging nations in the late 20th century). A further 17 players from four matches were added three months later (as well as one player misidentified as his brother, who had already been included in the earlier set of players).

== Players ==
Note that the "position" column lists the position at which the player made his Test debut, not necessarily the position for which he is best known. A position in parentheses indicates that the player debuted as a substitute.

Amateur Era. (1871–1996) Capped at District level:

| South of Scotland | Glasgow District | North and Midlands | Edinburgh District | Scottish Exiles | Other districts | No district caps |

Professional Era (from 1996) Capped at District level:

| Border Reivers | Glasgow Warriors | Caledonia Reds | Edinburgh Rugby | English clubs | Other teams | No club |

| Number | Name | Position | Date of debut | Opposition |
|---|---|---|---|---|
| 1 | John Arthur | Half back | 1871-03-27 | v England at Edinburgh |
| 2 | William Brown | Full back | 1871-03-27 | v England at Edinburgh |
| 3 | Angus Buchanan | Forward | 1871-03-27 | v England at Edinburgh |
| 4 | Thomas Chalmers | Full back | 1871-03-27 | v England at Edinburgh |
| 5 | Alfred Clunies-Ross | Full back | 1871-03-27 | v England at Edinburgh |
| 6 | Andrew Colville | Forward | 1871-03-27 | v England at Edinburgh |
| 7 | William Cross | Half back | 1871-03-27 | v England at Edinburgh |
| 8 | Daniel Drew | Forward | 1871-03-27 | v England at Edinburgh |
| 9 | James Finlay | Forward | 1871-03-27 | v England at Edinburgh |
| 10 | William Forsyth | Forward | 1871-03-27 | v England at Edinburgh |
| 11 | Bulldog Irvine | Forward | 1871-03-27 | v England at Edinburgh |
| 12 | William Lyall | Forward | 1871-03-27 | v England at Edinburgh |
| 13 | John Lisle Hall McFarlane | Forward | 1871-03-27 | v England at Edinburgh |
| 14 | Thomas Marshall | Half back | 1871-03-27 | v England at Edinburgh |
| 15 | James Mein | Forward | 1871-03-27 | v England at Edinburgh |
| 16 | Francis Moncreiff | Forward | 1871-03-27 | v England at Edinburgh |
| 17 | Robert Munro | Forward | 1871-03-27 | v England at Edinburgh |
| 18 | George Ritchie | Forward | 1871-03-27 | v England at Edinburgh |
| 19 | Alexander Robertson | Forward | 1871-03-27 | v England at Edinburgh |
| 20 | J. S. Thomson | Forward | 1871-03-27 | v England at Edinburgh |
| 21 | John Anderson | Forward | 1872-02-05 | v England at The Oval |
| 22 | Leslie Balfour-Melville | Full back | 1872-02-05 | v England at The Oval |
| 23 | Edward Bannerman | Forward | 1872-02-05 | v England at The Oval |
| 24 | Charles Cathcart | Forward | 1872-02-05 | v England at The Oval |
| 25 | James Howe McClure | Forward | 1872-02-05 | v England at The Oval |
| 26 | Reginald Maitland | Three Quarters | 1872-02-05 | v England at The Oval |
| 27 | William Marshall | Forward | 1872-02-05 | v England at The Oval |
| 28 | Frederick Maxwell | Forward | 1872-02-05 | v England at The Oval |
| 29 | Henry Renny-Tailyour | Forward | 1872-02-05 | v England at The Oval |
| 30 | Henry William Allan | Forward | 1873-03-03 | v England at Glasgow |
| 31 | Peter Anton | Forward | 1873-03-03 | v England at Glasgow |
| 32 | Charles Chalmers Bryce | Forward | 1873-03-03 | v England at Glasgow |
| 33 | John Davidson | Forward | 1873-03-03 | v England at Glasgow |
| 34 | William Grant | Half back | 1873-03-03 | v England at Glasgow |
| 35 | George Buchanan McClure | Three Quarters | 1873-03-03 | v England at Glasgow |
| 36 | Alexander Petrie | Forward | 1873-03-03 | v England at Glasgow |
| 37 | James Sanderson | Full back | 1873-03-03 | v England at Glasgow |
| 38 | Tom Whittington | Forward | 1873-03-03 | v England at Glasgow |
| 39 | Robert Wilson | Forward | 1873-03-03 | v England at Glasgow |
| 40 | Alexander Wood | Forward | 1873-03-03 | v England at Glasgow |
| 41 | Montgomerie Hamilton | Three Quarters | 1874-02-23 | v England at The Oval |
| 42 | Gilbert Heron | Forward | 1874-02-23 | v England at The Oval |
| 43 | William Hamilton Kidston | Three Quarters | 1874-02-23 | v England at The Oval |
| 44 | Tom Paterson Neilson | Forward | 1874-02-23 | v England at The Oval |
| 45 | James Reid | Forward | 1874-02-23 | v England at The Oval |
| 46 | Alexander Stewart | Half back | 1874-02-23 | v England at The Oval |
| 47 | John Kennedy Tod | Forward | 1874-02-23 | v England at The Oval |
| 48 | Arthur Young | Forward | 1874-02-23 | v England at The Oval |
| 49 | Allan Arthur | Forward | 1875-03-08 | v England at Edinburgh |
| 50 | Malcolm Cross | Three Quarters | 1875-03-08 | v England at Edinburgh |
| 51 | James Dunlop | Forward | 1875-03-08 | v England at Edinburgh |
| 52 | Arthur Finlay | Forward | 1875-03-08 | v England at Edinburgh |
| 53 | Ninian Finlay | Three Quarters | 1875-03-08 | v England at Edinburgh |
| 54 | George Raphael Fleming | Forward | 1875-03-08 | v England at Edinburgh |
| 55 | John Gordon | Half back | 1875-03-08 | v England at Edinburgh |
| 56 | Arthur Marshall | Forward | 1875-03-08 | v England at Edinburgh |
| 57 | Duncan Robertson | Forward | 1875-03-08 | v England at Edinburgh |
| 58 | William Bolton | Forward | 1876-03-06 | v England at The Oval |
| 59 | Nat Brewis | Forward | 1876-03-06 | v England at The Oval |
| 60 | James Carrick | Full back | 1876-03-06 | v England at The Oval |
| 61 | Gussie Graham | Forward | 1876-03-06 | v England at The Oval |
| 62 | John Junor | Forward | 1876-03-06 | v England at The Oval |
| 63 | David Lang | Forward | 1876-03-06 | v England at The Oval |
| 64 | George Paterson | Half back | 1876-03-06 | v England at The Oval |
| 65 | Charles Villar | Forward | 1876-03-06 | v England at The Oval |
| 66 | David Watson | Forward | 1876-03-06 | v England at The Oval |
| 67 | Henry Halcro Johnston | Full back | 1877-02-19 | v Ireland at Belfast |
| 68 | Robert MacKenzie | Three Quarters | 1877-02-19 | v Ireland at Belfast |
| 69 | Henry Melville Napier | Forward | 1877-02-19 | v Ireland at Belfast |
| 70 | Edward Innes Pocock | Three Quarters | 1877-02-19 | v Ireland at Belfast |
| 71 | Stewart Henry Smith | Half back | 1877-02-19 | v Ireland at Belfast |
| 72 | Thomas Torrie | Forward | 1877-03-05 | v England at Edinburgh |
| 73 | Louis Auldjo | Forward | 1878-03-04 | v England at The Oval |
| 74 | James Campbell | Half back | 1878-03-04 | v England at The Oval |
| 75 | Duncan Irvine | Forward | 1878-03-04 | v England at The Oval |
| 76 | Bill Maclagan | Full back | 1878-03-04 | v England at The Oval |
| 77 | George Macleod | Forward | 1878-03-04 | v England at The Oval |
| 78 | John Alexander Neilson | Half back | 1878-03-04 | v England at The Oval |
| 79 | Robert Ainslie | Forward | 1879-02-17 | v Ireland at Belfast |
| 80 | John Blair Brown | Forward | 1879-02-17 | v Ireland at Belfast |
| 81 | William Masters | Half back | 1879-02-17 | v Ireland at Belfast |
| 82 | Errol Smith | Forward | 1879-02-17 | v Ireland at Belfast |
| 83 | David Somerville | Forward | 1879-02-17 | v Ireland at Belfast |
| 84 | Edward Ewart | Forward | 1879-03-10 | v England at Edinburgh |
| 85 | William Sorley Brown | Half back | 1880-02-14 | v Ireland at Glasgow |
| 86 | David McCowan | Forward | 1880-02-14 | v Ireland at Glasgow |
| 87 | Charles Stewart | Forward | 1880-02-14 | v Ireland at Glasgow |
| 88 | John Guthrie Tait | Forward | 1880-02-14 | v Ireland at Glasgow |
| 89 | David Cassels | Forward | 1880-02-28 | v England at Manchester |
| 90 | Bryce Allan | Forward | 1881-02-19 | v Ireland at Belfast |
| 91 | Thomas Begbie | Full back | 1881-02-19 | v Ireland at Belfast |
| 92 | Charles Reid | Forward | 1881-02-19 | v Ireland at Belfast |
| 93 | George Robb | Forward | 1881-02-19 | v Ireland at Belfast |
| 94 | Pat Smeaton | Half back | 1881-02-19 | v Ireland at Belfast |
| 95 | Archibald Walker | Forward | 1881-02-19 | v Ireland at Belfast |
| 96 | Thomas Ainslie | Forward | 1881-03-19 | v England at Edinburgh |
| 97 | James Fraser | Forward | 1881-03-19 | v England at Edinburgh |
| 98 | Robert Maitland | Forward | 1881-03-19 | v England at Edinburgh |
| 99 | William Peterkin | Forward | 1881-03-19 | v England at Edinburgh |
| 100 | Andrew Don-Wauchope | Half back | 1881-03-19 | v England at Edinburgh |
| 101 | Thomas Anderson | Full back | 1882-02-18 | v Ireland at Glasgow |
| 102 | Fraser Gore | Forward | 1882-02-18 | v Ireland at Glasgow |
| 103 | Augustus Grant-Asher | Half back | 1882-02-18 | v Ireland at Glasgow |
| 104 | Frank Hunter | Three Quarters | 1882-02-18 | v Ireland at Glasgow |
| 105 | Andrew Philp | Three Quarters | 1882-03-04 | v England at Manchester |
| 106 | James Veitch | Full back | 1882-03-04 | v England at Manchester |
| 107 | James Walker | Forward | 1882-03-04 | v England at Manchester |
| 108 | William Andrew Walls | Forward | 1882-03-04 | v England at Manchester |
| 109 | John Jamieson | Forward | 1883-01-08 | v Wales at Edinburgh |
| 110 | David Kidston | Full back | 1883-01-08 | v Wales at Edinburgh |
| 111 | David McFarlan | Centre | 1883-01-08 | v Wales at Edinburgh |
| 112 | John Mowat | Forward | 1883-01-08 | v Wales at Edinburgh |
| 113 | George Aitchison | Half back | 1883-02-17 | v Ireland at Belfast |
| 114 | Marshall Reid | Centre | 1883-02-17 | v Ireland at Belfast |
| 115 | George Lindsay | Centre | 1884-01-12 | v Wales at Newport |
| 116 | John Tod | Forward | 1884-01-12 | v Wales at Newport |
| 117 | Charles Berry | Forward | 1884-02-16 | v Ireland at Edinburgh |
| 118 | Ernest Roland | Centre | 1884-02-16 | v Ireland at Edinburgh |
| 119 | Pat Harrower | Full back | 1885-01-10 | v Wales at Glasgow |
| 120 | Gardyne Maitland | Centre | 1885-01-10 | v Wales at Glasgow |
| 121 | Gordon Mitchell | Forward | 1885-01-10 | v Wales at Glasgow |
| 122 | Alexander Stephen | Centre | 1885-01-10 | v Wales at Glasgow |
| 123 | Henry Evans | Centre | 1885-02-21 | v Ireland at Belfast |
| 124 | Walter Irvine | Forward | 1885-02-21 | v Ireland at Belfast |
| 125 | Patrick Wauchope | Half back | 1885-02-21 | v Ireland at Belfast |
| 126 | Alexander Clay | Forward | 1886-01-09 | v Wales at Cardiff |
| 127 | J. French | Forward | 1886-01-09 | v Wales at Cardiff |
| 128 | William Holms | Centre | 1886-01-09 | v Wales at Cardiff |
| 129 | Flowerdew Macindoe | Full back | 1886-01-09 | v Wales at Cardiff |
| 130 | William MacLeod | Forward | 1886-01-09 | v Wales at Cardiff |
| 131 | Charles Milne | Forward | 1886-01-09 | v Wales at Cardiff |
| 132 | Reggie Morrison | Centre | 1886-01-09 | v Wales at Cardiff |
| 133 | Duncan MacLeod | Forward | 1886-02-20 | v Ireland at Edinburgh |
| 134 | Matthew McEwan | Forward | 1886-03-13 | v England at Edinburgh |
| 135 | George Wilson | Centre | 1886-03-13 | v England at Edinburgh |
| 136 | Hugh Ker | Forward | 1887-02-19 | v Ireland at Belfast |
| 137 | Robert MacMillan | Forward | 1887-02-19 | v Ireland at Belfast |
| 138 | David Morton | Forward | 1887-02-19 | v Ireland at Belfast |
| 139 | Charles Orr | Half back | 1887-02-19 | v Ireland at Belfast |
| 140 | Alexander Woodrow | Centre | 1887-02-19 | v Ireland at Belfast |
| 141 | Alec Cameron | Full back | 1887-02-26 | v Wales at Edinburgh |
| 142 | Henry Chambers | Full back | 1888-02-04 | v Wales at Newport |
| 143 | Alfred Duke | Forward | 1888-02-04 | v Wales at Newport |
| 144 | Macbeth Duncan | Centre | 1888-02-04 | v Wales at Newport |
| 145 | Charles Fraser | Half back | 1888-02-04 | v Wales at Newport |
| 146 | Henry Stevenson | Centre | 1888-02-04 | v Wales at Newport |
| 147 | Louis Stevenson | Forward | 1888-02-04 | v Wales at Newport |
| 148 | Tom White | Forward | 1888-02-04 | v Wales at Newport |
| 149 | Alexander Malcolm | Forward | 1888-03-10 | v Ireland at Edinburgh |
| 150 | Bill Auld | Forward | 1889-02-02 | v Wales at Edinburgh |
| 151 | John Boswell | Forward | 1889-02-02 | v Wales at Edinburgh |
| 152 | William Macdonald | Forward | 1889-02-02 | v Wales at Edinburgh |
| 153 | James Marsh | Centre | 1889-02-02 | v Wales at Edinburgh |
| 154 | Alfred Methuen | Forward | 1889-02-02 | v Wales at Edinburgh |
| 155 | Alexander Aitken | Forward | 1889-02-16 | v Ireland at Belfast |
| 156 | Darsie Anderson | Half back | 1889-02-16 | v Ireland at Belfast |
| 157 | James McKendrick | Forward | 1889-02-16 | v Ireland at Belfast |
| 158 | Jack Orr | Forward | 1889-02-16 | v Ireland at Belfast |
| 159 | Adam Dalgleish | Forward | 1890-02-01 | v Wales at Cardiff |
| 160 | Frederick Goodhue | Forward | 1890-02-01 | v Wales at Cardiff |
| 161 | Gregor MacGregor | Full back | 1890-02-01 | v Wales at Cardiff |
| 162 | Ian MacIntyre | Forward | 1890-02-01 | v Wales at Cardiff |
| 163 | Paul Clauss | Three Quarters | 1891-02-07 | v Wales at Edinburgh |
| 164 | Herbert Leggatt | Forward | 1891-02-07 | v Wales at Edinburgh |
| 165 | George Neilson | Forward | 1891-02-07 | v Wales at Edinburgh |
| 166 | Willie Neilson | Three Quarters | 1891-02-07 | v Wales at Edinburgh |
| 167 | William Gibson | Forward | 1891-02-21 | v Ireland at Belfast |
| 168 | William Wotherspoon | Half back | 1891-02-21 | v Ireland at Belfast |
| 169 | George Campbell | Three Quarters | 1892-02-06 | v Wales at Swansea |
| 170 | John Millar | Forward | 1892-02-06 | v Wales at Swansea |
| 171 | Nelson Henderson | Forward | 1892-02-20 | v Ireland at Edinburgh |
| 172 | James Woodburn | Three Quarters | 1892-02-20 | v Ireland at Edinburgh |
| 173 | William Cownie | Forward | 1893-02-04 | v Wales at Edinburgh |
| 174 | James Gowans | Three Quarters | 1893-02-04 | v Wales at Edinburgh |
| 175 | Robert Greig | Half back | 1893-02-04 | v Wales at Edinburgh |
| 176 | Thomas Hendry | Forward | 1893-02-04 | v Wales at Edinburgh |
| 177 | Henry Menzies | Forward | 1893-02-04 | v Wales at Edinburgh |
| 178 | David Robertson | Three Quarters | 1893-02-04 | v Wales at Edinburgh |
| 179 | James Bishop | Forward | 1893-02-18 | v Ireland at Belfast |
| 180 | Bill Donaldson | Half back | 1893-02-18 | v Ireland at Belfast |
| 181 | David Fisher | Forward | 1893-02-18 | v Ireland at Belfast |
| 182 | Jim Ford | Forward | 1893-02-18 | v Ireland at Belfast |
| 183 | John Simpson | Half back | 1893-02-18 | v Ireland at Belfast |
| 184 | Roger Davidson | Forward | 1893-03-04 | v England at Leeds |
| 185 | Tom Scott | Forward | 1893-03-04 | v England at Leeds |
| 186 | Henry Gedge | Wing | 1894-02-03 | v Wales at Newport |
| 187 | Willie McEwan | Forward | 1894-02-03 | v Wales at Newport |
| 188 | John Rogerson | Full back | 1894-02-03 | v Wales at Newport |
| 189 | Hugh Wright | Forward | 1894-02-03 | v Wales at Newport |
| 190 | Alexander Anderson | Forward | 1894-02-24 | v Ireland at Lansdowne Road |
| 191 | Gordon Neilson | Forward | 1894-03-17 | v England at Edinburgh |
| 192 | John Dods | Forward | 1895-01-26 | v Wales at Edinburgh |
| 193 | Mattha Elliot | Half back | 1895-01-26 | v Wales at Edinburgh |
| 194 | Allan Smith | Full back | 1895-01-26 | v Wales at Edinburgh |
| 195 | Harry Smith | Forward | 1895-01-26 | v Wales at Edinburgh |
| 196 | Robin Welsh | Wing | 1895-01-26 | v Wales at Edinburgh |
| 197 | Andrew Balfour | Forward | 1896-01-25 | v Wales at Cardiff |
| 198 | James Couper | Forward | 1896-01-25 | v Wales at Cardiff |
| 199 | Mark Morrison | Forward | 1896-01-25 | v Wales at Cardiff |
| 200 | Davie Patterson | Scrum half | 1896-01-25 | v Wales at Cardiff |
| 201 | Tom Scott | Centre | 1896-01-25 | v Wales at Cardiff |
| 202 | Alec Timms | Centre | 1896-01-25 | v Wales at Cardiff |
| 203 | Charles Fleming | Centre | 1896-02-15 | v Ireland at Lansdowne Road |
| 204 | George Turnbull | Forward | 1896-02-15 | v Ireland at Lansdowne Road |
| 205 | Alex Laidlaw | Forward | 1897-02-20 | v Ireland at Edinburgh |
| 206 | Ronald Stevenson | Forward | 1897-02-20 | v Ireland at Edinburgh |
| 207 | Alf Bucher | Wing | 1897-03-13 | v England at Manchester |
| 208 | Alec Robertson | Centre | 1897-03-13 | v England at Manchester |
| 209 | John Dykes | Forward | 1898-02-19 | v Ireland at Belfast |
| 210 | Graham Kerr | Forward | 1898-02-19 | v Ireland at Belfast |
| 211 | Joe Mabon | Half back | 1898-02-19 | v Ireland at Belfast |
| 212 | Andrew MacKinnon | Forward | 1898-02-19 | v Ireland at Belfast |
| 213 | Robert Neilson | Wing | 1898-02-19 | v Ireland at Belfast |
| 214 | James Reid | Full back | 1898-02-19 | v Ireland at Belfast |
| 215 | Robert Scott | Forward | 1898-02-19 | v Ireland at Belfast |
| 216 | Edward Spencer | Centre | 1898-02-19 | v Ireland at Belfast |
| 217 | Thomas Nelson | Centre | 1898-03-12 | v England at Edinburgh |
| 218 | Lawrence Harvey | Forward | 1899-02-18 | v Ireland at Inverleith |
| 219 | Douglas Monypenny | Centre | 1899-02-18 | v Ireland at Inverleith |
| 220 | George Lamond | Centre | 1899-03-04 | v Wales at Inverleith |
| 221 | Harry Rottenburg | Full back | 1899-03-04 | v Wales at Inverleith |
| 222 | William Thomson | Forward | 1899-03-04 | v Wales at Inverleith |
| 223 | Jimmy Gillespie | Half back | 1899-03-11 | v England at Blackheath |
| 224 | David Bedell-Sivright | Forward | 1900-01-27 | v Wales at Swansea |
| 225 | John Crabbie | Wing | 1900-01-27 | v Wales at Swansea |
| 226 | Frank Fasson | Half back | 1900-01-27 | v Wales at Swansea |
| 227 | Frederick Henderson | Forward | 1900-01-27 | v Wales at Swansea |
| 228 | William Morrison | Centre | 1900-01-27 | v Wales at Swansea |
| 229 | John Campbell | Forward | 1900-02-24 | v Ireland at Lansdowne Road |
| 230 | James Greenlees | Forward | 1900-02-24 | v Ireland at Lansdowne Road |
| 231 | William Scott | Forward | 1900-02-24 | v Ireland at Lansdowne Road |
| 232 | William Halliday Welsh | Wing | 1900-02-24 | v Ireland at Lansdowne Road |
| 233 | Lewis Bell | Forward | 1900-03-10 | v England at Inverleith |
| 234 | John Bell | Forward | 1901-02-09 | v Wales at Inverleith |
| 235 | Alexander Duncan | Full back | 1901-02-09 | v Wales at Inverleith |
| 236 | Alfred Fell | Wing | 1901-02-09 | v Wales at Inverleith |
| 237 | Andrew Flett | Forward | 1901-02-09 | v Wales at Inverleith |
| 238 | Alex Frew | Forward | 1901-02-09 | v Wales at Inverleith |
| 239 | Jimmy Ross | Forward | 1901-02-09 | v Wales at Inverleith |
| 240 | Robert Stronach | Forward | 1901-02-09 | v Wales at Inverleith |
| 241 | Phipps Turnbull | Centre | 1901-02-09 | v Wales at Inverleith |
| 242 | Francis Dods | Forward | 1901-02-23 | v Ireland at Inverleith |
| 243 | Robert Neill | Scrum half | 1901-03-09 | v England at Blackheath |
| 244 | John Bedell-Sivright | Forward | 1902-02-01 | v Wales at Cardiff |
| 245 | Willie Kyle | Forward | 1902-02-01 | v Wales at Cardiff |
| 246 | Herbert Bullmore | Forward | 1902-02-22 | v Ireland at Belfast |
| 247 | Andrew Drybrough | Centre | 1902-02-22 | v Ireland at Belfast |
| 248 | Ernest Simson | Half back | 1902-03-15 | v England at Inverleith |
| 249 | Alexander Cairns | Forward | 1903-02-07 | v Wales at Inverleith |
| 250 | Walter Forrest | Full back | 1903-02-07 | v Wales at Inverleith |
| 251 | Norman Kennedy | Lock | 1903-02-07 | v Wales at Inverleith |
| 252 | John Knox | Scrum half | 1903-02-07 | v Wales at Inverleith |
| 253 | Hugh Orr | Centre | 1903-02-07 | v Wales at Inverleith |
| 254 | Leonard West | Forward | 1903-02-07 | v Wales at Inverleith |
| 255 | Charles France | wing | 1903-02-28 | v Ireland at Inverleith |
| 256 | John Dallas | Forward | 1903-03-21 | v England at Richmond |
| 257 | Jimmy MacDonald | Wing | 1903-03-21 | v England at Richmond |
| 258 | Alexander Bisset | Half back | 1904-02-06 | v Wales at Swansea |
| 259 | George Crabbie | Wing | 1904-02-06 | v Wales at Swansea |
| 260 | Lewis Macleod | Centre | 1904-02-06 | v Wales at Swansea |
| 261 | Edward Ross | Forward | 1904-02-06 | v Wales at Swansea |
| 262 | William Milne | Forward | 1904-02-27 | v Ireland at Lansdowne Road |
| 263 | Joseph Waters | Forward | 1904-02-27 | v Ireland at Lansdowne Road |
| 264 | Hugh Fletcher | Forward | 1904-03-19 | v England at Inverleith |
| 265 | John Forbes | Centre | 1905-02-04 | v Wales at Inverleith |
| 266 | Andrew Little | Forward | 1905-02-04 | v Wales at Inverleith |
| 267 | Pat Munro | Half back | 1905-02-04 | v Wales at Inverleith |
| 268 | Andrew Ross | Forward | 1905-02-04 | v Wales at Inverleith |
| 269 | Maurice Dickson | Forward | 1905-02-25 | v Ireland at Inverleith |
| 270 | Harold McCowat | Wing | 1905-02-25 | v Ireland at Inverleith |
| 271 | William Ritchie | Wing | 1905-02-25 | v Ireland at Inverleith |
| 272 | Tom Elliot | Wing | 1905-03-18 | v England at Richmond |
| 273 | John MacCallum | Forward | 1905-03-18 | v England at Richmond |
| 274 | Hugh Monteith | Forward | 1905-03-18 | v England at Richmond |
| 275 | Douglas Schulze | Full back | 1905-03-18 | v England at Richmond |
| 276 | Louis Greig | Half back | 1905-11-18 | v New Zealand at Inverleith |
| 277 | James Moir Mackenzie | Forward | 1905-11-18 | v New Zealand at Inverleith |
| 278 | Kenneth Macleod | Centre | 1905-11-18 | v New Zealand at Inverleith |
| 279 | William Russell | Flanker | 1905-11-18 | v New Zealand at Inverleith |
| 280 | John Scoular | Full back | 1905-11-18 | v New Zealand at Inverleith |
| 281 | John Simson | Wing | 1905-11-18 | v New Zealand at Inverleith |
| 282 | Tennant Sloan | Wing | 1905-11-18 | v New Zealand at Inverleith |
| 283 | William Church | Centre | 1906-02-03 | v Wales at Cardiff |
| 284 | Alexander Purves | Wing | 1906-02-03 | v Wales at Cardiff |
| 285 | Maurie Walter | Centre | 1906-02-24 | v Ireland at Lansdowne Road |
| 286 | George Frew | Forward | 1906-11-17 | v South Africa at Glasgow |
| 287 | Campbell Geddes | Forward | 1906-11-17 | v South Africa at Glasgow |
| 288 | Louis Speirs | Forward | 1906-11-17 | v South Africa at Glasgow |
| 289 | William Thomson | Forward | 1906-11-17 | v South Africa at Glasgow |
| 290 | Duncan McGregor | Centre | 1907-02-02 | v Wales at Inverleith |
| 291 | George Sanderson | Forward | 1907-02-02 | v Wales at Inverleith |
| 292 | Jock Scott | Flanker | 1907-03-16 | v England at Blackheath |
| 293 | J.A. Brown | Hooker | 1908-02-01 | v Wales at Swansea |
| 294 | George Cunningham | Half back | 1908-02-01 | v Wales at Swansea |
| 295 | Geoffrey Gowlland | Forward | 1908-02-01 | v Wales at Swansea |
| 296 | Hugh Martin | Wing | 1908-02-01 | v Wales at Swansea |
| 297 | John Wilson | Forward | 1908-02-29 | v Ireland at Lansdowne Road |
| 298 | Colin Gilray | Centre | 1908-03-21 | v England at Inverleith |
| 299 | James Robertson | Fly Half | 1908-03-21 | v England at Inverleith |
| 300 | Lewis Robertson | Forward | 1908-03-21 | v England at Inverleith |
| 301 | Albert Wade | Scrum half | 1908-03-21 | v England at Inverleith |
| 302 | Alexander Angus | Centre | 1909-02-06 | v Wales at Inverleith |
| 303 | James Tennent | Half back | 1909-02-06 | v Wales at Inverleith |
| 304 | William Lely | Prop | 1909-02-27 | v Ireland at Inverleith |
| 305 | Robert Lindsay-Watson | Wing | 1909-02-27 | v Ireland at Inverleith |
| 306 | John McGregor | Fly Half | 1909-02-27 | v Ireland at Inverleith |
| 307 | James Pearson | Centre | 1909-02-27 | v Ireland at Inverleith |
| 308 | Charles Stuart | Forward | 1909-02-27 | v Ireland at Inverleith |
| 309 | Alexander Moodie | Forward | 1909-03-20 | v England at Richmond |
| 310 | James Reid Kerr | Forward | 1909-03-20 | v England at Richmond |
| 311 | Fletcher Buchanan | Full back | 1910-01-22 | v France at Inverleith |
| 312 | Ian Robertson | Wing | 1910-01-22 | v France at Inverleith |
| 313 | Robert Stevenson | Forward | 1910-01-22 | v France at Inverleith |
| 314 | Eric Milroy | Scrum half | 1910-02-05 | v Wales at Cardiff |
| 315 | Walter Sutherland | Wing | 1910-02-05 | v Wales at Cardiff |
| 316 | Cecil Abercrombie | Forward | 1910-02-26 | v Ireland at Belfast |
| 317 | Jimmy Dobson | Wing | 1910-02-26 | v Ireland at Belfast |
| 318 | Andrew Lindsay | Scrum half | 1910-02-26 | v Ireland at Belfast |
| 319 | Donald Macpherson | Wing | 1910-02-26 | v Ireland at Belfast |
| 320 | Rowland Fraser | Prop | 1911-01-02 | v France at Colombes |
| 321 | Frank Osler | Scrum half | 1911-01-02 | v France at Colombes |
| 322 | Alexander Stevenson | Forward | 1911-01-02 | v France at Colombes |
| 323 | Borth Todd | Full back | 1911-01-02 | v France at Colombes |
| 324 | Frederick Turner | Flanker | 1911-01-02 | v France at Colombes |
| 325 | Eric Young | Centre | 1911-01-02 | v France at Colombes |
| 326 | Donald Grant | Wing | 1911-02-04 | v Wales at Inverleith |
| 327 | John MacDonald | Wing | 1911-02-04 | v Wales at Inverleith |
| 328 | Andrew Ross | Lock | 1911-02-04 | v Wales at Inverleith |
| 329 | Andrew Greig | Full back | 1911-02-25 | v Ireland at Inverleith |
| 330 | Carl Ogilvy | Centre | 1911-02-25 | v Ireland at Inverleith |
| 331 | David Bain | Prop | 1911-03-18 | v England at Twickenham |
| 332 | John Dobson | Hooker | 1911-03-18 | v England at Twickenham |
| 333 | James Henderson | Fly Half | 1911-03-18 | v England at Twickenham |
| 334 | William Hutchison | Lock | 1911-03-18 | v England at Twickenham |
| 335 | Ronald Simson | Centre | 1911-03-18 | v England at Twickenham |
| 336 | Stephen Steyn | Wing | 1911-03-18 | v England at Twickenham |
| 337 | Walter Dickson | Full back | 1912-01-20 | v France at Inverleith |
| 338 | Sandy Gunn | Fly Half | 1912-01-20 | v France at Inverleith |
| 339 | Colin Hill | Forward | 1912-01-20 | v France at Inverleith |
| 340 | Dave Howie | Lock | 1912-01-20 | v France at Inverleith |
| 341 | John Hume | Scrum half | 1912-01-20 | v France at Inverleith |
| 342 | William Purves | Lock | 1912-01-20 | v France at Inverleith |
| 343 | Robert Robertson | Flanker | 1912-01-20 | v France at Inverleith |
| 344 | John Will | Wing | 1912-01-20 | v France at Inverleith |
| 345 | James Boyd | Fly Half | 1912-03-16 | v England at Inverleith |
| 346 | Billy Burnet | Centre | 1912-03-16 | v England at Inverleith |
| 347 | Charlie Usher | Flanker | 1912-03-16 | v England at Inverleith |
| 348 | Patrick Blair | Prop | 1912-11-23 | v South Africa at Inverleith |
| 349 | Roland Gordon | Centre | 1913-01-01 | v France at Parc des Princes |
| 350 | George Ledingham | Forward | 1913-01-01 | v France at Parc des Princes |
| 351 | John McDougall | Flanker | 1913-01-01 | v France at Parc des Princes |
| 352 | Bill Stewart | Wing | 1913-01-01 | v France at Parc des Princes |
| 353 | Rufus Bruce Lockhart | Fly Half | 1913-02-01 | v Wales at Inverleith |
| 354 | Thomas Bowie | Fly Half | 1913-02-22 | v Ireland at Inverleith |
| 355 | George Maxwell | Flanker | 1913-02-22 | v Ireland at Inverleith |
| 356 | Eric Loudoun-Shand | Centre | 1913-03-15 | v England at Twickenham |
| 357 | John Sweet | Wing | 1913-03-15 | v England at Twickenham |
| 358 | William Wallace | Full back | 1913-03-15 | v England at Twickenham |
| 359 | David Donald | Prop | 1914-02-07 | v Wales at Cardiff |
| 360 | Andrew Hamilton | Fly Half | 1914-02-07 | v Wales at Cardiff |
| 361 | Arthur Laing | Lock | 1914-02-07 | v Wales at Cardiff |
| 362 | Ronald Scobie | Centre | 1914-02-07 | v Wales at Cardiff |
| 363 | Allen Sloan | Fly Half | 1914-02-07 | v Wales at Cardiff |
| 364 | Archibald Stewart | Forward | 1914-02-07 | v Wales at Cardiff |
| 365 | Archibald Symington | Lock | 1914-02-07 | v Wales at Cardiff |
| 366 | Jock Wemyss | Prop | 1914-02-07 | v Wales at Cardiff |
| 367 | Jack Warren | Centre | 1914-02-28 | v Ireland at Lansdowne Road |
| 368 | James Huggan | Wing | 1914-03-21 | v England at Inverleith |
| 369 | Ian Moffat-Pender | Prop | 1914-03-21 | v England at Inverleith |
| 370 | Eric Young | Flanker | 1914-03-21 | v England at Inverleith |
| 371 | Gerard Crole | Wing | 1920-01-01 | v France at Parc des Princes |
| 372 | Denoon Duncan | Prop | 1920-01-01 | v France at Parc des Princes |
| 373 | Ernest Fahmy | Centre | 1920-01-01 | v France at Parc des Princes |
| 374 | Robert Gallie | Hooker | 1920-01-01 | v France at Parc des Princes |
| 375 | Finlay Kennedy | Prop | 1920-01-01 | v France at Parc des Princes |
| 376 | William Murray | Lock | 1920-01-01 | v France at Parc des Princes |
| 377 | George Pattullo | Full back | 1920-01-01 | v France at Parc des Princes |
| 378 | George Thom | Flanker | 1920-01-01 | v France at Parc des Princes |
| 379 | Eric MacKay | Wing | 1920-02-07 | v Wales at Inverleith |
| 380 | Neil McPherson | Lock | 1920-02-07 | v Wales at Inverleith |
| 381 | Jake Selby | Scrum half | 1920-02-07 | v Wales at Inverleith |
| 382 | Arthur Browning | Wing | 1920-02-28 | v Ireland at Inverleith |
| 383 | Charles Nimmo | Scrum half | 1920-03-20 | v England at Twickenham |
| 384 | John Bannerman | Lock | 1921-01-22 | v France at Inverleith |
| 385 | Jimmy Carmichael | Wing | 1921-01-22 | v France at Inverleith |
| 386 | Ronald Cumming | Hooker | 1921-01-22 | v France at Inverleith |
| 387 | Hector Forsayth | Full back | 1921-01-22 | v France at Inverleith |
| 388 | Leslie Gracie | Centre | 1921-01-22 | v France at Inverleith |
| 389 | Ian Kilgour | Wing | 1921-01-22 | v France at Inverleith |
| 390 | Alpin Thomson | Centre | 1921-01-22 | v France at Inverleith |
| 391 | John Buchanan | Hooker | 1921-02-05 | v Wales at Swansea |
| 392 | Russell Donald | Fly Half | 1921-02-05 | v Wales at Swansea |
| 393 | George Douglas | Lock | 1921-02-05 | v Wales at Swansea |
| 394 | Hamish Shaw | No. 8 | 1921-02-05 | v Wales at Swansea |
| 395 | John McCrow | Wing | 1921-02-26 | v Ireland at Lansdowne Road |
| 396 | George Murray | Flanker | 1921-02-26 | v Ireland at Lansdowne Road |
| 397 | Jock Stewart | Flanker | 1921-02-26 | v Ireland at Lansdowne Road |
| 398 | Cecil MacKenzie | Centre | 1921-03-19 | v England at Inverleith |
| 399 | David Bertram | Hooker | 1922-01-02 | v France at Colombes |
| 400 | Doug Davies | No. 8 | 1922-01-02 | v France at Colombes |
| 401 | James Dykes | Fly Half | 1922-01-02 | v France at Colombes |
| 402 | Bill Johnston | Full back | 1922-01-02 | v France at Colombes |
| 403 | Jock Lawrie | Flanker | 1922-01-02 | v France at Colombes |
| 404 | Eric Liddell | Wing | 1922-01-02 | v France at Colombes |
| 405 | Phil Macpherson | Centre | 1922-01-02 | v France at Colombes |
| 406 | Andrew Stevenson | Prop | 1922-01-02 | v France at Colombes |
| 407 | Willie Bryce | Scrum half | 1922-02-04 | v Wales at Inverleith |
| 408 | William Dobson | Prop | 1922-02-04 | v Wales at Inverleith |
| 409 | Ronald Warren | Centre | 1922-02-04 | v Wales at Inverleith |
| 410 | Jimmy Tolmie | Wing | 1922-03-18 | v England at Twickenham |
| 411 | Dan Drysdale | Full back | 1923-01-20 | v France at Inverleith |
| 412 | David Kerr | Prop | 1923-01-20 | v France at Inverleith |
| 413 | Ted McLaren | Centre | 1923-01-20 | v France at Inverleith |
| 414 | Sammy McQueen | Fly Half | 1923-01-20 | v France at Inverleith |
| 415 | Ludovic Stuart | Lock | 1923-01-20 | v France at Inverleith |
| 416 | Johnnie Wallace | Wing | 1923-01-20 | v France at Inverleith |
| 417 | Robert Simpson | Flanker | 1923-02-24 | v Ireland at Lansdowne Road |
| 418 | Kelvin Hendrie | Flanker | 1924-01-01 | v France at Paris |
| 419 | Robert Howie | Prop | 1924-01-01 | v France at Paris |
| 420 | Chris Mackintosh | Wing | 1924-01-01 | v France at Paris |
| 421 | Andrew Ross | Hooker | 1924-01-01 | v France at Paris |
| 422 | Herbert Waddell | Fly Half | 1924-01-01 | v France at Paris |
| 423 | George Aitken | Centre | 1924-02-02 | v Wales at Inverleith |
| 424 | Sandy Gillies | No. 8 | 1924-02-02 | v Wales at Inverleith |
| 425 | Ian S. Smith | Wing | 1924-02-02 | v Wales at Inverleith |
| 426 | Robert Henderson | Prop | 1924-02-23 | v Ireland at Inverleith |
| 427 | Robert Millar | Wing | 1924-02-23 | v Ireland at Inverleith |
| 428 | James Gilchrist | Hooker | 1925-01-24 | v France at Inverleith |
| 429 | David MacMyn | Lock | 1925-01-24 | v France at Inverleith |
| 430 | Jimmy Nelson | Scrum Half | 1925-01-24 | v France at Inverleith |
| 431 | John Paterson | Flanker | 1925-01-24 | v France at Inverleith |
| 432 | Jumbo Scott | Flanker | 1925-01-24 | v France at Inverleith |
| 433 | William Stevenson | Prop | 1925-01-24 | v France at Inverleith |
| 434 | Jimmie Ireland | Hooker | 1925-02-07 | v Wales at Swansea |
| 435 | William Berkley | Prop | 1926-01-02 | v France at Colombes |
| 436 | Roy Kinnear | Centre | 1926-01-02 | v France at Colombes |
| 437 | Bill Simmers | Wing | 1926-02-06 | v Wales at Murrayfield |
| 438 | Jimmie Graham | Flanker | 1926-02-27 | v Ireland at Murrayfield |
| 439 | Gordon Boyd | Wing | 1926-03-20 | v England at Twickenham |
| 440 | Jock Allan | Prop | 1927-01-22 | v France at Murrayfield |
| 441 | Edward Taylor | Wing | 1927-02-05 | v Wales at Cardiff |
| 442 | Peter Douty | Scrum half | 1927-12-17 | v Australia at Murrayfield |
| 443 | William Ferguson | Prop | 1927-12-17 | v Australia at Murrayfield |
| 444 | Harry Greenlees | Fly Half | 1927-12-17 | v Australia at Murrayfield |
| 445 | Robert Kelly | Centre | 1927-12-17 | v Australia at Murrayfield |
| 446 | William Roughead | Hooker | 1927-12-17 | v Australia at Murrayfield |
| 447 | Willie Welsh | No. 8 | 1927-12-17 | v Australia at Murrayfield |
| 448 | Jimmy Ferguson | Prop | 1928-02-04 | v Wales at Murrayfield |
| 449 | John Goodfellow | Wing | 1928-02-04 | v Wales at Murrayfield |
| 450 | Jo Hume | Centre | 1928-02-25 | v Ireland at Murrayfield |
| 451 | Harry Lind | Fly Half | 1928-02-25 | v Ireland at Murrayfield |
| 452 | Alex Brown | Fly Half | 1928-03-17 | v England at Twickenham |
| 453 | Jock Beattie | Lock | 1929-01-19 | v France at Murrayfield |
| 454 | Hugh MacKintosh | Hooker | 1929-01-19 | v France at Murrayfield |
| 455 | Robert Smith | Prop | 1929-01-19 | v France at Murrayfield |
| 456 | Kenneth Wright | Flanker | 1929-01-19 | v France at Murrayfield |
| 457 | Tom Aitchison | Full back | 1929-02-02 | v Wales at Swansea |
| 458 | Thomas Gow Brown | Centre | 1929-02-02 | v Wales at Swansea |
| 459 | Charlie Brown | Wing | 1929-03-16 | v England at Murrayfield |
| 460 | William Emslie | Fly Half | 1930-01-01 | v France at Colombes |
| 461 | Reginald Langrish | Full back | 1930-01-01 | v France at Colombes |
| 462 | Bobby Rowand | No. 8 | 1930-01-01 | v France at Colombes |
| 463 | Jack Stewart | Lock | 1930-01-01 | v France at Colombes |
| 464 | Frank Waters | Flanker | 1930-01-01 | v France at Colombes |
| 465 | Bill Agnew | Flanker | 1930-02-01 | v Wales at Murrayfield |
| 466 | Jerry Foster | Prop | 1930-02-01 | v Wales at Murrayfield |
| 467 | Thomas Hart | Centre | 1930-02-01 | v Wales at Murrayfield |
| 468 | Drummond Ford | Wing | 1930-02-22 | v Ireland at Murrayfield |
| 469 | James Hutton | Centre | 1930-03-15 | v England at Twickenham |
| 470 | Henry Polson | Flanker | 1930-03-15 | v England at Twickenham |
| 471 | Alexander McLaren | Lock | 1931-01-24 | v France at Murrayfield |
| 472 | Alexander Walker | Flanker | 1931-01-24 | v France at Murrayfield |
| 473 | Alfred Wilson | Centre | 1931-01-24 | v France at Murrayfield |
| 474 | James Wilson | No. 8 | 1931-01-24 | v France at Murrayfield |
| 475 | Donald Crichton-Miller | Flanker | 1931-02-07 | v Wales at Cardiff |
| 476 | Doddie Wood | Wing | 1931-02-07 | v Wales at Cardiff |
| 477 | Ross Logan | Scrum half | 1931-03-21 | v England at Murrayfield |
| 478 | James Forrest | Wing | 1932-01-16 | v South Africa at Murrayfield |
| 479 | Thomas Lawther | Full back | 1932-01-16 | v South Africa at Murrayfield |
| 480 | Mark Stewart | Lock | 1932-01-16 | v South Africa at Murrayfield |
| 481 | Harry Hutton | Full back | 1932-02-27 | v Ireland at Murrayfield |
| 482 | Andrew Dykes | Full back | 1932-03-19 | v England at Twickenham |
| 483 | John MacArthur | Scrum half | 1932-03-19 | v England at Twickenham |
| 484 | George Ritchie | No. 8 | 1932-03-19 | v England at Twickenham |
| 485 | Francis Wright | Lock | 1932-03-19 | v England at Twickenham |
| 486 | David Brown | Full back | 1933-02-04 | v Wales at Swansea |
| 487 | Ken Fyfe | Wing | 1933-02-04 | v Wales at Swansea |
| 488 | Mac Henderson | No. 8 | 1933-02-04 | v Wales at Swansea |
| 489 | Kenneth Jackson | Fly Half | 1933-02-04 | v Wales at Swansea |
| 490 | Bertie Lorraine | Centre | 1933-02-04 | v Wales at Swansea |
| 491 | James Ritchie | Hooker | 1933-02-04 | v Wales at Swansea |
| 492 | Jim Thom | Prop | 1933-02-04 | v Wales at Swansea |
| 493 | Jock Waters | Prop | 1933-02-04 | v Wales at Swansea |
| 494 | Peter Gedge | Wing | 1933-04-01 | v Ireland at Lansdowne Road |
| 495 | Bill Burnet | Prop | 1934-02-03 | v Wales at Murrayfield |
| 496 | Charles Dick | Centre | 1934-02-03 | v Wales at Murrayfield |
| 497 | Lindsay Lambie | Hooker | 1934-02-03 | v Wales at Murrayfield |
| 498 | Douglas Lowe | Lock | 1934-02-03 | v Wales at Murrayfield |
| 499 | Kenneth Marshall | Full back | 1934-02-03 | v Wales at Murrayfield |
| 500 | Jack Park | Wing | 1934-02-03 | v Wales at Murrayfield |
| 501 | Wilson Shaw | Wing | 1934-02-03 | v Wales at Murrayfield |
| 502 | David Thom | Flanker | 1934-02-03 | v Wales at Murrayfield |
| 503 | James Cotter | Fly Half | 1934-02-24 | v Ireland at Murrayfield |
| 504 | Gordon Cottington | Hooker | 1934-02-24 | v Ireland at Murrayfield |
| 505 | John Crawford | Wing | 1934-02-24 | v Ireland at Murrayfield |
| 506 | Jack Watherston | Flanker | 1934-02-24 | v Ireland at Murrayfield |
| 507 | Charles Grieve | Fly Half | 1935-02-02 | v Wales at Cardiff |
| 508 | Bob Grieve | Prop | 1935-02-02 | v Wales at Cardiff |
| 509 | Johnny Johnston | Wing | 1935-02-02 | v Wales at Cardiff |
| 510 | Ronald Murray | Prop | 1935-02-02 | v Wales at Cardiff |
| 511 | Alastair McNeil | Prop | 1935-02-23 | v Ireland at Lansdowne Road |
| 512 | William Murdoch | Centre | 1935-03-16 | v England at Murrayfield |
| 513 | Peter Tait | Hooker | 1935-03-16 | v England at Murrayfield |
| 514 | Gordon Gray | Hooker | 1935-11-23 | v New Zealand at Murrayfield |
| 515 | James Kerr | Full back | 1935-11-23 | v New Zealand at Murrayfield |
| 516 | Duncan Shaw | Prop | 1935-11-23 | v New Zealand at Murrayfield |
| 517 | Mac Cooper | Flanker | 1936-02-01 | v Wales at Murrayfield |
| 518 | Harvey Druitt | Hooker | 1936-02-01 | v Wales at Murrayfield |
| 519 | Laurie Duff | No. 8 | 1936-02-01 | v Wales at Murrayfield |
| 520 | Hugh Murray | Centre | 1936-02-01 | v Wales at Murrayfield |
| 521 | Vivian Weston | Flanker | 1936-02-22 | v Ireland at Murrayfield |
| 522 | Robert Whitworth | Wing | 1936-02-22 | v Ireland at Murrayfield |
| 523 | Rob Barrie | Flanker | 1936-03-21 | v England at Twickenham |
| 524 | Maurice Henderson | Prop | 1937-02-06 | v Wales at Swansea |
| 525 | George Horsburgh | Lock | 1937-02-06 | v Wales at Swansea |
| 526 | William Inglis | Prop | 1937-02-06 | v Wales at Swansea |
| 527 | Duncan Macrae | Centre | 1937-02-06 | v Wales at Swansea |
| 528 | Christian Melville | Lock | 1937-02-06 | v Wales at Swansea |
| 529 | William Ross | Fly Half | 1937-02-06 | v Wales at Swansea |
| 530 | William Young | Flanker | 1937-02-06 | v Wales at Swansea |
| 531 | Rab Bruce Lockhart | Fly Half | 1937-02-27 | v Ireland at Lansdowne Road |
| 532 | Ian Shaw | Centre | 1937-02-27 | v Ireland at Lansdowne Road |
| 533 | Robert Dryden | Wing | 1937-03-20 | v England at Murrayfield |
| 534 | Jake Borthwick | Prop | 1938-02-05 | v Wales at Murrayfield |
| 535 | Wilf Crawford | Flanker | 1938-02-05 | v Wales at Murrayfield |
| 536 | Tom Dorward | Scrum half | 1938-02-05 | v Wales at Murrayfield |
| 537 | Archibald Drummond | Wing | 1938-02-05 | v Wales at Murrayfield |
| 538 | John Forrest | Wing | 1938-02-05 | v Wales at Murrayfield |
| 539 | John Hastie | Hooker | 1938-02-05 | v Wales at Murrayfield |
| 540 | George Roberts | Full back | 1938-02-05 | v Wales at Murrayfield |
| 541 | Allan Roy | Lock | 1938-02-05 | v Wales at Murrayfield |
| 542 | William Blackadder | Prop | 1938-03-19 | v England at Twickenham |
| 543 | William Renwick | Wing | 1938-03-19 | v England at Twickenham |
| 544 | Willie Brydon | Scrum half | 1939-02-04 | v Wales at Cardiff |
| 545 | John Craig | Wing | 1939-02-04 | v Wales at Cardiff |
| 546 | George Gallie | Prop | 1939-02-04 | v Wales at Cardiff |
| 547 | Donny Innes | Centre | 1939-02-04 | v Wales at Cardiff |
| 548 | Bill Purdie | Prop | 1939-02-04 | v Wales at Cardiff |
| 549 | Sammy Sampson | Hooker | 1939-02-04 | v Wales at Cardiff |
| 550 | Ian Graham | Hooker | 1939-02-25 | v Ireland at Lansdowne Road |
| 551 | Ian Henderson | Prop | 1939-02-25 | v Ireland at Lansdowne Road |
| 552 | Donald MacKenzie | No. 8 | 1939-02-25 | v Ireland at Lansdowne Road |
| 553 | William Penman | Full Back | 1939-02-25 | v Ireland at Lansdowne Road |
| 554 | Gus Black | Scrum half | 1947-01-01 | v France at Colombes |
| 555 | Russell Bruce | Centre | 1947-01-01 | v France at Colombes |
| 556 | George Cawkwell | Lock | 1947-01-01 | v France at Colombes |
| 557 | David Deas | No. 8 | 1947-01-01 | v France at Colombes |
| 558 | Charlie Drummond | Centre | 1947-01-01 | v France at Colombes |
| 559 | Doug Elliot | Flanker | 1947-01-01 | v France at Colombes |
| 560 | Keith Geddes | Full back | 1947-01-01 | v France at Colombes |
| 561 | John Hunter | Lock | 1947-01-01 | v France at Colombes |
| 562 | Graeme Jackson | Wing | 1947-01-01 | v France at Colombes |
| 563 | Ian Lumsden | Fly Half | 1947-01-01 | v France at Colombes |
| 564 | Tom McGlashan | Prop | 1947-01-01 | v France at Colombes |
| 565 | Bill MacLennan | Wing | 1947-01-01 | v France at Colombes |
| 566 | John Henry Orr | Flanker | 1947-01-01 | v France at Colombes |
| 567 | Gordon Watt | Prop | 1947-01-01 | v France at Colombes |
| 568 | Richard Aitkin | Prop | 1947-02-01 | v Wales at Murrayfield |
| 569 | Frank Coutts | Lock | 1947-02-01 | v Wales at Murrayfield |
| 570 | David Mackenzie | Wing | 1947-02-01 | v Wales at Murrayfield |
| 571 | Ernie Anderson | Scrum half | 1947-02-22 | v Ireland at Murrayfield |
| 572 | Howard Campbell | Prop | 1947-02-22 | v Ireland at Murrayfield |
| 573 | Alastair Fisher | Hooker | 1947-02-22 | v Ireland at Murrayfield |
| 574 | Jimmy Lees | No. 8 | 1947-02-22 | v Ireland at Murrayfield |
| 575 | Duncan McLean | Flanker | 1947-02-22 | v Ireland at Murrayfield |
| 576 | Billy Munro | Fly Half | 1947-02-22 | v Ireland at Murrayfield |
| 577 | Dave Valentine | Flanker | 1947-02-22 | v Ireland at Murrayfield |
| 578 | Dallas Allardice | Scrum half | 1947-11-22 | v Australia at Murrayfield |
| 579 | Robert Bruce | Prop | 1947-11-22 | v Australia at Murrayfield |
| 580 | Leslie Currie | Lock | 1947-11-22 | v Australia at Murrayfield |
| 581 | Hamish Dawson | Lock | 1947-11-22 | v Australia at Murrayfield |
| 582 | Peter Hepburn | Fly Half | 1947-11-22 | v Australia at Murrayfield |
| 583 | Dod Lyall | Hooker | 1947-11-22 | v Australia at Murrayfield |
| 584 | Charlie McDonald | Wing | 1947-11-22 | v Australia at Murrayfield |
| 585 | Thomas Wright | Centre | 1947-11-22 | v Australia at Murrayfield |
| 586 | Bill Black | Prop | 1948-01-24 | v France at Murrayfield |
| 587 | Angus Cameron | Centre | 1948-02-07 | v Wales at Cardiff |
| 588 | Stewart Coltman | Prop | 1948-02-28 | v Ireland at Lansdowne Road |
| 589 | Logie Bruce Lockhart | Centre | 1948-03-20 | v England at Murrayfield |
| 590 | Robert Finlay | Lock | 1948-03-20 | v England at Murrayfield |
| 591 | Gibbie Abercrombie | Hooker | 1949-01-15 | v France at Colombes |
| 592 | Laurie Gloag | Centre | 1949-01-15 | v France at Colombes |
| 593 | Doug Keller | Flanker | 1949-01-15 | v France at Colombes |
| 594 | Peter Kininmonth | No. 8 | 1949-01-15 | v France at Colombes |
| 595 | Doug Smith | Wing | 1949-01-15 | v France at Colombes |
| 596 | Gully Wilson | Lock | 1949-01-15 | v France at Colombes |
| 597 | Alex Thomson | Lock | 1949-02-26 | v Ireland at Murrayfield |
| 598 | John Macphail | Hooker | 1949-03-19 | v England at Twickenham |
| 599 | Steven Wright | Prop | 1949-03-19 | v England at Twickenham |
| 600 | Grahame Budge | Prop | 1950-01-14 | v France at Murrayfield |
| 601 | Dod Burrell | Full back | 1950-01-14 | v France at Murrayfield |
| 602 | Arthur Dorward | Scrum half | 1950-01-14 | v France at Murrayfield |
| 603 | Bob Gemmill | Lock | 1950-01-14 | v France at Murrayfield |
| 604 | Ranald Macdonald | Centre | 1950-01-14 | v France at Murrayfield |
| 605 | Douglas Muir | Lock | 1950-01-14 | v France at Murrayfield |
| 606 | Donald Sloan | Centre | 1950-01-14 | v France at Murrayfield |
| 607 | Donald Scott | Wing | 1950-02-25 | v Ireland at Lansdowne Road |
| 608 | Tommy Gray | Full back | 1950-03-18 | v England at Murrayfield |
| 609 | Hamish Scott | Flanker | 1950-03-18 | v England at Murrayfield |
| 610 | Allan Cameron | Wing | 1951-01-13 | v France at Colombes |
| 611 | Ian Coutts | Centre | 1951-01-13 | v France at Colombes |
| 612 | John Hegarty | Flanker | 1951-01-13 | v France at Colombes |
| 613 | Hamish Inglis | Lock | 1951-01-13 | v France at Colombes |
| 614 | Norman Mair | Hooker | 1951-01-13 | v France at Colombes |
| 615 | David Rose | Wing | 1951-01-13 | v France at Colombes |
| 616 | Iain Ross | Scrum half | 1951-01-13 | v France at Colombes |
| 617 | Oliver Turnbull | Centre | 1951-01-13 | v France at Colombes |
| 618 | Bob Wilson | Prop | 1951-01-13 | v France at Colombes |
| 619 | Bob Gordon | Wing | 1951-02-03 | v Wales at Murrayfield |
| 620 | Bob Taylor | Flanker | 1951-02-03 | v Wales at Murrayfield |
| 621 | Ian Thomson | Full back | 1951-02-03 | v Wales at Murrayfield |
| 622 | Ken Dalgleish | Wing | 1951-02-24 | v Ireland at Murrayfield |
| 623 | John Hart | Wing | 1951-11-24 | v South Africa at Murrayfield |
| 624 | Jimmie Johnston | Lock | 1951-11-24 | v South Africa at Murrayfield |
| 625 | Les Allan | Centre | 1952-01-12 | v France at Murrayfield |
| 626 | Ian Cordial | Centre | 1952-01-12 | v France at Murrayfield |
| 627 | James Davidson | Fly Half | 1952-01-12 | v France at Murrayfield |
| 628 | John Fox | Prop | 1952-01-12 | v France at Murrayfield |
| 629 | Adam Fulton | Scrum half | 1952-01-12 | v France at Murrayfield |
| 630 | Jim Greenwood | Flanker | 1952-01-12 | v France at Murrayfield |
| 631 | Norman Munnoch | Hooker | 1952-01-12 | v France at Murrayfield |
| 632 | Mike Walker | Lock | 1952-01-12 | v France at Murrayfield |
| 633 | Neil Cameron | Full back | 1952-03-15 | v England at Murrayfield |
| 634 | Percy Friebe | No. 8 | 1952-03-15 | v England at Murrayfield |
| 635 | David Gilbert-Smith | Flanker | 1952-03-15 | v England at Murrayfield |
| 636 | Jim Inglis | Prop | 1952-03-15 | v England at Murrayfield |
| 637 | Grant Weatherstone | Wing | 1952-03-15 | v England at Murrayfield |
| 638 | Chick Henderson | Lock | 1953-01-10 | v France at Colombes |
| 639 | Jock King | Hooker | 1953-01-10 | v France at Colombes |
| 640 | Donald Macdonald | No. 8 | 1953-01-10 | v France at Colombes |
| 641 | Keith McMillan | Flanker | 1953-01-10 | v France at Colombes |
| 642 | Bruce Thomson | Prop | 1953-01-10 | v France at Colombes |
| 643 | Alec Valentine | Flanker | 1953-01-10 | v France at Colombes |
| 644 | Donald Cameron | Centre | 1953-02-28 | v Ireland at Murrayfield |
| 645 | Edwin Henriksen | No. 8 | 1953-02-28 | v Ireland at Murrayfield |
| 646 | Gurth Hoyer-Millar | Hooker | 1953-02-28 | v Ireland at Murrayfield |
| 647 | Ken Spence | Scrum half | 1953-02-28 | v Ireland at Murrayfield |
| 648 | John Howard Wilson | Prop | 1953-02-28 | v Ireland at Murrayfield |
| 649 | William Cowie | No. 8 | 1953-03-21 | v England at Twickenham |
| 650 | Walter Kerr | Flanker | 1953-03-21 | v England at Twickenham |
| 651 | Ian Swan | Wing | 1953-03-21 | v England at Twickenham |
| 652 | Ewen Fergusson | Lock | 1954-01-09 | v France at Murrayfield |
| 653 | Robert MacEwen | Hooker | 1954-01-09 | v France at Murrayfield |
| 654 | Hugh McLeod | Prop | 1954-01-09 | v France at Murrayfield |
| 655 | John Marshall | Full back | 1954-01-09 | v France at Murrayfield |
| 656 | Ernest Michie | Lock | 1954-01-09 | v France at Murrayfield |
| 657 | Adam Robson | Flanker | 1954-01-09 | v France at Murrayfield |
| 658 | Kim Elgie | Centre | 1954-02-13 | v New Zealand at Murrayfield |
| 659 | Pat MacLachlan | Scrum half | 1954-02-13 | v New Zealand at Murrayfield |
| 660 | Graham Ross | Fly Half | 1954-02-13 | v New Zealand at Murrayfield |
| 661 | Hamish Kemp | Lock | 1954-04-10 | v Wales at Swansea |
| 662 | Jimmy Docherty | Fly Half | 1955-01-08 | v France at Colombes |
| 663 | Hugh Duffy | Flanker | 1955-01-08 | v France at Colombes |
| 664 | Micky Grant | Centre | 1955-01-08 | v France at Colombes |
| 665 | Ian Hastie | Prop | 1955-01-08 | v France at Colombes |
| 666 | Bill Relph | Hooker | 1955-01-08 | v France at Colombes |
| 667 | Robin Charters | Centre | 1955-02-05 | v Wales at Murrayfield |
| 668 | Tom Elliot | Prop | 1955-02-05 | v Wales at Murrayfield |
| 669 | Bill Glen | Flanker | 1955-02-05 | v Wales at Murrayfield |
| 670 | Jim Nichol | Scrum half | 1955-02-05 | v Wales at Murrayfield |
| 671 | Arthur Smith | Wing | 1955-02-05 | v Wales at Murrayfield |
| 672 | Robin Chisholm | Full back | 1955-02-26 | v Ireland at Murrayfield |
| 673 | Ian MacGregor | Flanker | 1955-02-26 | v Ireland at Murrayfield |
| 674 | Nim Campbell | Scrum half | 1956-01-14 | v France at Murrayfield |
| 675 | Keith Macdonald | Centre | 1956-01-14 | v France at Murrayfield |
| 676 | Tommy McClung | Centre | 1956-02-25 | v Ireland at Lansdowne Road |
| 677 | George Stevenson | Centre | 1956-03-17 | v England at Murrayfield |
| 678 | Eddie McKeating | Centre | 1957-01-12 | v France at Colombes |
| 679 | Ken Scotland | Full back | 1957-01-12 | v France at Colombes |
| 680 | John Allan | Wing | 1957-02-23 | v Ireland at Murrayfield |
| 681 | Jimmy Maxwell | Fly Half | 1957-02-23 | v Ireland at Murrayfield |
| 682 | Ken Smith | No. 8 | 1957-02-23 | v Ireland at Murrayfield |
| 683 | Gordon Waddell | Fly Half | 1957-03-16 | v England at Twickenham |
| 684 | Norman Bruce | Hooker | 1958-01-11 | v France at Murrayfield |
| 685 | Mike Robertson | Flanker | 1958-01-11 | v France at Murrayfield |
| 686 | Tremayne Rodd | Scrum half | 1958-01-11 | v France at Murrayfield |
| 687 | Malcolm Swan | Lock | 1958-01-11 | v France at Murrayfield |
| 688 | Christopher Elliot | Wing | 1958-03-15 | v England at Murrayfield |
| 689 | Stanley Coughtrie | Scrum half | 1959-01-10 | v France at Colombes |
| 690 | Iain Laughland | Centre | 1959-01-10 | v France at Colombes |
| 691 | Frans ten Bos | Lock | 1959-03-21 | v England at Twickenham |
| 692 | Jock Davidson | No. 8 | 1959-03-21 | v England at Twickenham |
| 693 | David Rollo | Prop | 1959-03-21 | v England at Twickenham |
| 694 | Jim Shackleton | Centre | 1959-03-21 | v England at Twickenham |
| 695 | Keith Bearne | No. 8 | 1960-01-09 | v France at Murrayfield |
| 696 | Joe McPartlin | Centre | 1960-01-09 | v France at Murrayfield |
| 697 | Gregor Sharp | Fly Half | 1960-01-09 | v France at Murrayfield |
| 698 | Charlie Stewart | Flanker | 1960-02-06 | v Wales at Cardiff |
| 699 | David Edwards | Flanker | 1960-02-27 | v Ireland at Lansdowne Road |
| 700 | Oliver Grant | Lock | 1960-02-27 | v Ireland at Lansdowne Road |
| 701 | Brian Shillinglaw | Scrum half | 1960-02-27 | v Ireland at Lansdowne Road |
| 702 | Ronnie Thomson | Wing | 1960-02-27 | v Ireland at Lansdowne Road |
| 703 | Pat Burnet | Centre | 1960-04-30 | v South Africa at Port Elizabeth |
| 704 | Walter Hart | Flanker | 1960-04-30 | v South Africa at Port Elizabeth |
| 705 | Mike Campbell-Lamerton | Lock | 1961-01-07 | v France at Colombes |
| 706 | Ron Cowan | Centre | 1961-01-07 | v France at Colombes |
| 707 | John Douglas | No. 8 | 1961-01-07 | v France at Colombes |
| 708 | Ken Ross | Flanker | 1961-01-21 | v South Africa at Murrayfield |
| 709 | Alexander Hastie | Scrum half | 1961-02-11 | v Wales at Murrayfield |
| 710 | John Brash | Flanker | 1961-03-18 | v England at Twickenham |
| 711 | Ron Glasgow | Flanker | 1962-01-13 | v France at Murrayfield |
| 712 | Bob Steven | Prop | 1962-02-24 | v Ireland at Lansdowne Road |
| 713 | Cameron Boyle | Prop | 1963-01-12 | v France at Colombes |
| 714 | William Watherston | Flanker | 1963-01-12 | v France at Colombes |
| 715 | Donald White | Centre | 1963-01-12 | v France at Colombes |
| 716 | Colin Blaikie | Full back | 1963-02-23 | v Ireland at Murrayfield |
| 717 | Pringle Fisher | No. 8 | 1963-03-16 | v England at Twickenham |
| 718 | Brian Henderson | Centre | 1963-03-16 | v England at Twickenham |
| 719 | Brian Neill | Prop | 1963-03-16 | v England at Twickenham |
| 720 | Peter Brown | Lock | 1964-01-04 | v France at Murrayfield |
| 721 | Billy Hunter | Lock | 1964-01-04 | v France at Murrayfield |
| 722 | Jim Telfer | Flanker | 1964-01-04 | v France at Murrayfield |
| 723 | Stewart Wilson | Full back | 1964-01-04 | v France at Murrayfield |
| 724 | David Chisholm | Fly Half | 1964-02-22 | v Ireland at Lansdowne Road |
| 725 | Douglas Jackson | Wing | 1964-02-22 | v Ireland at Lansdowne Road |
| 726 | Derrick Grant | Flanker | 1965-01-09 | v France at Colombes |
| 727 | Frank Laidlaw | Hooker | 1965-01-09 | v France at Colombes |
| 728 | Brian Simmers | Fly Half | 1965-01-09 | v France at Colombes |
| 729 | Peter Stagg | Lock | 1965-01-09 | v France at Colombes |
| 730 | Norm Suddon | Prop | 1965-02-06 | v Wales at Murrayfield |
| 731 | David Whyte | Wing | 1965-02-06 | v Wales at Murrayfield |
| 732 | Sandy Hinshelwood | Wing | 1966-01-15 | v France at Murrayfield |
| 733 | John MacDonald | Prop | 1966-01-15 | v France at Murrayfield |
| 734 | Jock Turner | Fly Half | 1966-02-05 | v Wales at Cardiff |
| 735 | Alasdair Boyle | No. 8 | 1966-12-17 | v Australia at Murrayfield |
| 736 | Sandy Carmichael | Prop | 1967-02-25 | v Ireland at Murrayfield |
| 737 | Rob Welsh | Centre | 1967-02-25 | v Ireland at Murrayfield |
| 738 | Ian McCrae | Scrum half | 1967-03-18 | v England at Twickenham |
| 739 | John Frame | Centre | 1967-12-02 | v New Zealand at Murrayfield |
| 740 | Bob Keddie | Wing | 1967-12-02 | v New Zealand at Murrayfield |
| 741 | George Mitchell | Lock | 1967-12-02 | v New Zealand at Murrayfield |
| 742 | Hamish Keith | Wing | 1968-01-13 | v France at Murrayfield |
| 743 | Tommy Elliot | Flanker | 1968-02-03 | v Wales at Cardiff |
| 744 | Rodger Arneil | Flanker | 1968-02-24 | v Ireland at Lansdowne Road |
| 745 | Charlie Hodgson | Wing | 1968-02-24 | v Ireland at Lansdowne Road |
| 746 | Alastair McHarg | Lock | 1968-02-24 | v Ireland at Lansdowne Road |
| 747 | Gordon Connell | Scrum half | 1968-03-16 | v England at Murrayfield |
| 748 | Derek Deans | Hooker | 1968-03-16 | v England at Murrayfield |
| 749 | Ian Robertson | Fly Half | 1968-03-16 | v England at Murrayfield |
| 750 | Chris Rea | Centre | 1968-11-02 | v Australia at Murrayfield |
| 751 | Colin Telfer | Fly Half | 1968-11-02 | v Australia at Murrayfield |
| 752 | Dick Allan | Scrum half | 1969-02-22 | v Ireland at Murrayfield |
| 753 | Wilson Lauder | Flanker | 1969-02-22 | v Ireland at Murrayfield |
| 754 | Gordon Macdonald | (Full Back) | 1969-02-22 | v Ireland at Murrayfield |
| 755 | Ian McLauchlan | Prop | 1969-03-15 | v England at Twickenham |
| 756 | Billy Steele | Wing | 1969-03-15 | v England at Twickenham |
| 757 | Alastair Biggar | Wing | 1969-12-06 | v South Africa at Murrayfield |
| 758 | Gordon Brown | Lock | 1969-12-06 | v South Africa at Murrayfield |
| 759 | Duncan Paterson | Scrum half | 1969-12-06 | v South Africa at Murrayfield |
| 760 | Ian S. G. Smith | Full back | 1969-12-06 | v South Africa at Murrayfield |
| 761 | Mike Smith | Wing | 1970-02-07 | v Wales at Cardiff |
| 762 | Robert Young | Scrum half | 1970-02-07 | v Wales at Cardiff |
| 763 | Ken Oliver | No. 8 | 1970-06-06 | v Australia at Sydney |
| 764 | Nairn MacEwan | Flanker | 1971-01-16 | v France at Colombes |
| 765 | Ronald Hannah | Wing | 1971-02-27 | v Ireland at Murrayfield |
| 766 | Arthur Brown | Full back | 1971-03-20 | v England at Twickenham |
| 767 | Quintin Dunlop | Hooker | 1971-03-20 | v England at Twickenham |
| 768 | Stephen Turk | (Centre) | 1971-03-20 | v England at Twickenham |
| 769 | Gordon Strachan | (No. 8) | 1971-03-27 | v England at Murrayfield |
| 770 | Bobby Clark | Hooker | 1972-01-15 | v France at Murrayfield |
| 771 | Jim Renwick | Centre | 1972-01-15 | v France at Murrayfield |
| 772 | Alan Lawson | (Scrum Half) | 1972-01-15 | v France at Murrayfield |
| 773 | Ian Barnes | Lock | 1972-02-05 | v Wales at Cardiff |
| 774 | Lewis Dick | (Wing) | 1972-02-05 | v Wales at Cardiff |
| 775 | Ian Forsyth | Centre | 1972-12-16 | v New Zealand at Murrayfield |
| 776 | Andy Irvine | Full back | 1972-12-16 | v New Zealand at Murrayfield |
| 777 | Ian McGeechan | Fly Half | 1972-12-16 | v New Zealand at Murrayfield |
| 778 | David Shedden | Wing | 1972-12-16 | v New Zealand at Murrayfield |
| 779 | Ronald Wright | Lock | 1973-01-13 | v France at Parc des Princes |
| 780 | Jock Millican | Flanker | 1973-02-03 | v Wales at Murrayfield |
| 781 | Dougie Morgan | Scrum half | 1973-02-03 | v Wales at Murrayfield |
| 782 | Hamish Bryce | (Prop) | 1973-02-24 | v Ireland at Murrayfield |
| 783 | Drew Gill | Wing | 1973-03-31 | v Presidents XV at Murrayfield |
| 784 | Duncan Madsen | Hooker | 1974-01-19 | v Wales at Cardiff |
| 785 | Bill Watson | No. 8 | 1974-01-19 | v Wales at Cardiff |
| 786 | Michael Hunter | Centre | 1974-03-16 | v France at Murrayfield |
| 787 | David Bell | Centre | 1975-02-01 | v Ireland at Murrayfield |
| 788 | Mike Biggar | Flanker | 1975-02-01 | v Ireland at Murrayfield |
| 789 | David Leslie | No. 8 | 1975-02-01 | v Ireland at Murrayfield |
| 790 | Graham Birkett | Centre | 1975-06-14 | v New Zealand at Auckland |
| 791 | Colin Fisher | Hooker | 1975-06-14 | v New Zealand at Auckland |
| 792 | Bruce Hay | Full back | 1975-06-14 | v New Zealand at Auckland |
| 793 | George Mackie | No. 8 | 1975-12-06 | v Australia at Murrayfield |
| 794 | Alastair Cranston | Centre | 1976-02-07 | v Wales at Cardiff |
| 795 | Alan Tomes | Lock | 1976-02-21 | v England at Murrayfield |
| 796 | Ron Wilson | Fly Half | 1976-02-21 | v England at Murrayfield |
| 797 | Jim Aitken | Prop | 1977-01-15 | v England at Twickenham |
| 798 | Alex Brewster | Flanker | 1977-01-15 | v England at Twickenham |
| 799 | Don Macdonald | No. 8 | 1977-01-15 | v England at Twickenham |
| 800 | Bill Gammell | Wing | 1977-02-19 | v Ireland at Murrayfield |
| 801 | Norman Pender | Prop | 1977-02-19 | v Ireland at Murrayfield |
| 802 | Brian Hegarty | Flanker | 1978-01-21 | v Ireland at Lansdowne Road |
| 803 | Colin Deans | Hooker | 1978-02-04 | v France at Murrayfield |
| 804 | Graham Hogg | (Wing) | 1978-02-04 | v France at Murrayfield |
| 805 | Richard Breakey | Fly Half | 1978-03-04 | v England at Murrayfield |
| 806 | David Gray | Lock | 1978-03-04 | v England at Murrayfield |
| 807 | Bob Cunningham | Prop | 1978-12-09 | V New Zealand at Murrayfield |
| 808 | Gordon Dickson | Flanker | 1978-12-09 | v New Zealand at Murrayfield |
| 809 | Keith Robertson | Wing | 1978-12-09 | v New Zealand at Murrayfield |
| 810 | Ian Lambie | (No. 8) | 1978-12-09 | v New Zealand at Murrayfield |
| 811 | John Rutherford | Fly Half | 1979-01-20 | v Wales at Murrayfield |
| 812 | Iain Milne | Prop | 1979-03-03 | v Ireland at Murrayfield |
| 813 | David Johnston | Centre | 1979-11-10 | v New Zealand at Murrayfield |
| 814 | John Beattie | No. 8 | 1980-02-02 | v Ireland at Lansdowne Road |
| 815 | James Burnett | Prop | 1980-02-02 | v Ireland at Lansdowne Road |
| 816 | Bill Cuthbertson | Lock | 1980-02-02 | v Ireland at Lansdowne Road |
| 817 | Roy Laidlaw | Scrum half | 1980-02-02 | v Ireland at Lansdowne Road |
| 818 | Steve Munro | Wing | 1980-02-02 | v Ireland at Lansdowne Road |
| 819 | Kenneth Lawrie | (Hooker) | 1980-02-16 | v France at Murrayfield |
| 820 | Bryan Gossman | Fly Half | 1980-03-01 | v Wales at Cardiff |
| 821 | Norrie Rowan | Prop | 1980-03-01 | v Wales at Cardiff |
| 822 | Jimmy Gossman | (Centre) | 1980-03-15 | v England at Murrayfield |
| 823 | Jim Calder | Flanker | 1981-01-17 | v France at Parc des Princes |
| 824 | Iain Paxton | No. 8 | 1981-06-13 | v New Zealand at Dunedin |
| 825 | Roger Baird | Wing | 1981-12-19 | v Australia at Murrayfield |
| 826 | Eric Paxton | Flanker | 1982-02-20 | v Ireland at Lansdowne Road |
| 827 | Derek White | Flanker | 1982-03-06 | v France at Murrayfield |
| 828 | Jim Pollock | Wing | 1982-03-20 | v Wales at Cardiff |
| 829 | Rick Gordon | Centre | 1982-07-04 | v Australia at Brisbane |
| 830 | Gerry McGuinness | Prop | 1982-07-04 | v Australia at Brisbane |
| 831 | Peter Dods | Full back | 1983-01-15 | v Ireland at Murrayfield |
| 832 | Tom Smith | Lock | 1983-03-05 | v England at Twickenham |
| 833 | Euan Kennedy | Centre | 1983-11-12 | v New Zealand at Murrayfield |
| 834 | Alister Campbell | Lock | 1984-03-03 | v Ireland at Lansdowne Road |
| 835 | Gordon Hunter | (Scrum Half) | 1984-03-03 | v Ireland at Lansdowne Road |
| 836 | Gary Callander | Hooker | 1984-05-12 | v Romania at Bucharest |
| 837 | Sean McGaughey | Flanker | 1984-05-12 | v Romania at Bucharest |
| 838 | John Jeffrey | Flanker | 1984-12-08 | v Australia at Murrayfield |
| 839 | Gregor MacKenzie | Prop | 1984-12-08 | v Australia at Murrayfield |
| 840 | Peter Steven | Wing | 1984-12-08 | v Australia at Murrayfield |
| 841 | Douglas Wyllie | Fly Half | 1984-12-08 | v Australia at Murrayfield |
| 842 | Keith Murray | Centre | 1985-02-02 | v Ireland at Murrayfield |
| 843 | Iwan Tukalo | Wing | 1985-02-02 | v Ireland at Murrayfield |
| 844 | Finlay Calder | Flanker | 1986-01-18 | v France at Murrayfield |
| 845 | Jeremy Campbell-Lamerton | Lock | 1986-01-18 | v France at Murrayfield |
| 846 | Matt Duncan | Wing | 1986-01-18 | v France at Murrayfield |
| 847 | Gavin Hastings | Full back | 1986-01-18 | v France at Murrayfield |
| 848 | Scott Hastings | Centre | 1986-01-18 | v France at Murrayfield |
| 849 | David Sole | Prop | 1986-01-18 | v France at Murrayfield |
| 850 | Alan Tait | (Centre) | 1987-05-23 | v France at Christchurch |
| 851 | Greig Oliver | Scrum half | 1987-05-30 | v Zimbabwe at Wellington |
| 852 | Richard Cramb | (Fly Half) | 1987-06-02 | v Romania at Dunedin |
| 853 | Derek Turnbull | Flanker | 1987-06-06 | v New Zealand at Christchurch |
| 854 | Damian Cronin | Lock | 1988-01-16 | v Ireland at Lansdowne Road |
| 855 | Andrew Ker | Fly Half | 1988-02-20 | v Wales at Cardiff |
| 856 | Gary Armstrong | Scrum half | 1988-11-19 | v Australia at Murrayfield |
| 857 | Graham Marshall | (Flanker) | 1988-11-19 | v Australia at Murrayfield |
| 858 | Craig Chalmers | Fly Half | 1989-01-21 | v Wales at Murrayfield |
| 859 | Chris Gray | Lock | 1989-01-21 | v Wales at Murrayfield |
| 860 | Sean Lineen | Centre | 1989-01-21 | v Wales at Murrayfield |
| 861 | Kenny Milne | Hooker | 1989-01-21 | v Wales at Murrayfield |
| 862 | Paul Burnell | Prop | 1989-02-04 | v England at Twickenham |
| 863 | Tony Stanger | Wing | 1989-10-28 | v Fiji at Murrayfield |
| 864 | George Buchanan-Smith | (Flanker) | 1989-10-28 | v Fiji at Murrayfield |
| 865 | Lindsay Renwick | Wing | 1989-12-09 | v Romania at Murrayfield |
| 866 | John Allan | Hooker | 1990-06-16 | v New Zealand at Dunedin |
| 867 | Alex Moore | Wing | 1990-06-23 | v New Zealand at Auckland |
| 868 | Doddie Weir | Lock | 1990-11-10 | v Argentina at Murrayfield |
| 869 | David Milne | (Prop) | 1991-10-05 | v Japan at Murrayfield |
| 870 | Alan Watt | Prop | 1991-10-09 | v Zimbabwe at Murrayfield |
| 871 | Graham Shiel | (Centre) | 1991-10-12 | v Ireland at Murrayfield |
| 872 | Neil Edwards | Lock | 1992-01-18 | v England at Murrayfield |
| 873 | Dave McIvor | Flanker | 1992-01-18 | v England at Murrayfield |
| 874 | Andy Nicol | Scrum half | 1992-01-18 | v England at Murrayfield |
| 875 | Ian R. Smith | Flanker | 1992-01-18 | v England at Murrayfield |
| 876 | Rob Wainwright | (Flanker) | 1992-02-15 | v Ireland at Lansdowne Road |
| 877 | Peter Jones | (Prop) | 1992-03-21 | v Wales at Cardiff |
| 878 | Carl Hogg | Flanker | 1992-06-13 | v Australia at Sydney |
| 879 | Peter Wright | Prop | 1992-06-13 | v Australia at Sydney |
| 880 | Ian Corcoran | (Hooker) | 1992-06-13 | v Australia at Sydney |
| 881 | Kenny Logan | Full back | 1992-06-21 | v Australia at Brisbane |
| 882 | Martin Scott | Hooker | 1992-06-21 | v Australia at Brisbane |
| 883 | Iain Morrison | Flanker | 1993-01-16 | v Ireland at Murrayfield |
| 884 | Andy Reed | Lock | 1993-01-16 | v Ireland at Murrayfield |
| 885 | Derek Stark | Wing | 1993-01-16 | v Ireland at Murrayfield |
| 886 | Gregor Townsend | (Fly Half) | 1993-03-06 | v England at Twickenham |
| 887 | Ian Jardine | Centre | 1993-11-20 | v New Zealand at Murrayfield |
| 888 | Andrew MacDonald | Lock | 1993-11-20 | v New Zealand at Murrayfield |
| 889 | Bryan Redpath | (Scrum Half) | 1993-11-20 | v New Zealand at Murrayfield |
| 890 | Shade Munro | Lock | 1994-01-15 | v Wales at Cardiff |
| 891 | Alan Sharp | Prop | 1994-02-05 | v England at Murrayfield |
| 892 | Peter Walton | Flanker | 1994-02-05 | v England at Murrayfield |
| 893 | Michael Dods | (Full Back) | 1994-03-05 | v Ireland at Lansdowne Road |
| 894 | Craig Joiner | Wing | 1994-06-04 | v Argentina at Buenos Aires |
| 895 | Kevin McKenzie | Hooker | 1994-06-04 | v Argentina at Buenos Aires |
| 896 | Scott Nichol | (Centre) | 1994-06-11 | v Argentina at Buenos Aires |
| 897 | Derrick Patterson | Scrum half | 1994-11-19 | v South Africa at Murrayfield |
| 898 | Jeremy Richardson | Lock | 1994-11-19 | v South Africa at Murrayfield |
| 899 | Stewart Campbell | Lock | 1995-01-21 | v Canada at Murrayfield |
| 900 | Dave Hilton | Prop | 1995-01-21 | v Canada at Murrayfield |
| 901 | Eric Peters | No. 8 | 1995-01-21 | v Canada at Murrayfield |
| 902 | John Manson | (Prop) | 1995-03-18 | v England at Twickenham |
| 903 | Jim Hay | Hooker | 1995-11-18 | v Samoa at Murrayfield |
| 904 | Stuart Reid | Flanker | 1995-11-18 | v Samoa at Murrayfield |
| 905 | Rowen Shepherd | Full back | 1995-11-18 | v Samoa at Murrayfield |
| 906 | Ronnie Eriksson | Centre | 1996-06-15 | v New Zealand at Dunedin |
| 907 | Barry Stewart | Prop | 1996-06-22 | v New Zealand at Auckland |
| 908 | Murray Wallace | Flanker | 1996-11-09 | v Australia at Murrayfield |
| 909 | Mattie Stewart | Prop | 1996-12-14 | v Italy at Murrayfield |
| 910 | Graham Ellis | Hooker | 1997-01-18 | v Wales at Murrayfield |
| 911 | Tom Smith | Prop | 1997-02-01 | v England at Twickenham |
| 912 | Cameron Glasgow | (Full Back) | 1997-03-15 | v France at Parc des Princes |
| 913 | Duncan Hodge | (Fly Half) | 1997-03-15 | v France at Parc des Princes |
| 914 | James Craig | Wing | 1997-11-22 | v Australia at Murrayfield |
| 915 | Grant McKelvey | Hooker | 1997-11-22 | v Australia at Murrayfield |
| 916 | Scott Murray | Lock | 1997-11-22 | v Australia at Murrayfield |
| 917 | Adam Roxburgh | Flanker | 1997-11-22 | v Australia at Murrayfield |
| 918 | George Graham | (Prop) | 1997-11-22 | v Australia at Murrayfield |
| 919 | Stuart Grimes | (Lock) | 1997-11-22 | v Australia at Murrayfield |
| 920 | Gordon Bulloch | Hooker | 1997-12-06 | v South Africa at Murrayfield |
| 921 | Simon Holmes | Flanker | 1998-01-24 | v Italy at Treviso |
| 922 | Derrick Lee | (Full Back) | 1998-02-07 | v Ireland at Lansdowne Road |
| 923 | Shaun Longstaff | (Wing) | 1998-02-21 | v France at Murrayfield |
| 924 | Cameron Murray | (Wing) | 1998-03-22 | v England at Murrayfield |
| 925 | Hugh Gilmour | Wing | 1998-05-26 | v Fiji at Suva |
| 926 | Gordon McIlwham | Prop | 1998-05-26 | v Fiji at Suva |
| 927 | Matt Proudfoot | Prop | 1998-05-26 | v Fiji at Suva |
| 928 | Glenn Metcalfe | Full back | 1998-06-13 | v Australia at Sydney |
| 929 | Gordon Simpson | Flanker | 1998-06-13 | v Australia at Sydney |
| 930 | John Leslie | Centre | 1998-11-21 | v South Africa at Murrayfield |
| 931 | Jamie Mayer | Centre | 1998-11-21 | v South Africa at Murrayfield |
| 932 | Budge Pountney | Flanker | 1998-11-21 | v South Africa at Murrayfield |
| 933 | Martin Leslie | (Flanker) | 1998-11-21 | v South Africa at Murrayfield |
| 934 | Iain Fairley | Scrum half | 1999-03-06 | v Italy at Murrayfield |
| 935 | Graeme Burns | (Scrum Half) | 1999-03-06 | v Italy at Murrayfield |
| 936 | Steve Brotherstone | (Hooker) | 1999-03-20 | v Ireland at Murrayfield |
| 937 | James McLaren | Centre | 1999-08-21 | v Argentina at Murrayfield |
| 938 | Robbie Russell | Hooker | 1999-08-28 | v Romania at Glasgow |
| 939 | Cameron Mather | (Flanker) | 1999-08-28 | v Romania at Glasgow |
| 940 | Chris Paterson | Full back | 1999-10-16 | v Spain at Murrayfield |
| 941 | Craig Moir | Wing | 2000-03-18 | v Wales at Millennium Stadium |
| 942 | Richard Metcalfe | Lock | 2000-04-02 | v England at Murrayfield |
| 943 | Jason White | Flanker | 2000-04-02 | v England at Murrayfield |
| 944 | Ross Beattie | No. 8 | 2000-06-24 | v New Zealand at Dunedin |
| 945 | Iain Fullarton | (Lock) | 2000-06-24 | v New Zealand at Dunedin |
| 946 | Jon Petrie | No. 8 | 2000-07-01 | v New Zealand at Auckland |
| 947 | Graeme Beveridge | (Scrum Half) | 2000-07-01 | v New Zealand at Auckland |
| 948 | Nathan Hines | (Lock) | 2000-07-01 | v New Zealand at Auckland |
| 949 | Steve Scott | (Hooker) | 2000-07-01 | v New Zealand at Auckland |
| 950 | Alan Bulloch | Centre | 2000-11-04 | v United States of America at Murrayfield |
| 951 | Jon Steel | Wing | 2000-11-04 | v United States of America at Murrayfield |
| 952 | Simon Taylor | No. 8 | 2000-11-04 | v United States of America at Murrayfield |
| 953 | Andrew Henderson | (Centre) | 2001-09-22 | v Ireland at Murrayfield |
| 954 | Andrew Mower | Flanker | 2001-11-10 | v Tonga at Murrayfield |
| 955 | Gordon Ross | Fly Half | 2001-11-10 | v Tonga at Murrayfield |
| 956 | Roland Reid | (Wing) | 2001-11-10 | v Tonga at Murrayfield |
| 957 | Brendan Laney | Full back | 2001-11-24 | v New Zealand at Murrayfield |
| 958 | Mike Blair | Scrum half | 2002-06-15 | v Canada at Vancouver |
| 959 | Andy Craig | Centre | 2002-06-15 | v Canada at Vancouver |
| 960 | Rory Kerr | Wing | 2002-06-15 | v Canada at Vancouver |
| 961 | Craig Smith | Prop | 2002-06-15 | v Canada at Vancouver |
| 962 | Ben Hinshelwood | (Centre) | 2002-06-15 | v Canada at Vancouver |
| 963 | Allan Jacobsen | (Prop) | 2002-06-15 | v Canada at Vancouver |
| 964 | Donnie Macfadyen | (Flanker) | 2002-06-15 | v Canada at Vancouver |
| 965 | Marcus Di Rollo | (Centre) | 2002-06-22 | v United States of America at San Francisco |
| 966 | Andrew Hall | (Flanker) | 2002-06-22 | v United States of America at San Francisco |
| 967 | Bruce Douglas | Prop | 2002-11-09 | v Romania at Murrayfield |
| 968 | Stuart Moffat | Full back | 2002-11-09 | v Romania at Murrayfield |
| 969 | Nikki Walker | Wing | 2002-11-09 | v Romania at Murrayfield |
| 970 | Gavin Kerr | (Prop) | 2003-02-16 | v Ireland at Murrayfield |
| 971 | Kevin Utterson | Centre | 2003-02-23 | v France at Stade de France |
| 972 | Simon Danielli | Wing | 2003-08-23 | v Italy at Murrayfield |
| 973 | Andrew Dall | (Flanker) | 2003-08-30 | v Wales at Millennium Stadium |
| 974 | Dougie Hall | Hooker | 2003-08-30 | v Wales at Millennium Stadium |
| 975 | Simon Webster | Wing | 2003-09-06 | v Ireland at Murrayfield |
| 976 | Chris Cusiter | Scrum half | 2004-02-14 | v Wales at Millennium Stadium |
| 977 | Ally Hogg | Flanker | 2004-02-14 | v Wales at Millennium Stadium |
| 978 | Tom Philip | Centre | 2004-02-14 | v Wales at Millennium Stadium |
| 979 | Dan Parks | Fly Half | 2004-02-14 | v Wales at Millennium Stadium |
| 980 | Sean Lamont | Wing | 2004-06-04 | v Samoa at Wellington |
| 981 | Hugo Southwell | Full back | 2004-06-04 | v Samoa at Wellington |
| 982 | Graeme Morrison | Centre | 2004-06-13 | v Australia at Melbourne |
| 983 | Craig Hamilton | Lock | 2004-06-19 | v Australia at Sydney |
| 984 | Scott Gray | Flanker | 2004-11-06 | v Australia at Murrayfield |
| 985 | Scott MacLeod | Lock | 2004-11-06 | v Australia at Murrayfield |
| 986 | Ross Ford | Hooker | 2004-11-06 | v Australia at Murrayfield |
| 987 | Alastair Kellock | Lock | 2004-11-06 | v Australia at Murrayfield |
| 988 | Jon Dunbar | (Lock) | 2005-02-05 | v France at Stade de France |
| 989 | Rory Lamont | Wing | 2005-03-13 | v Wales at Murrayfield |
| 990 | Kelly Brown | Flanker | 2005-06-05 | v Romania at Bucharest |
| 991 | Scott Lawson | Hooker | 2005-06-05 | v Romania at Bucharest |
| 992 | Phil Godman | Fly Half | 2005-06-05 | v Romania at Bucharest |
| 993 | Euan Murray | Prop | 2005-06-05 | v Romania at Bucharest |
| 994 | Andy Wilson | (No. 8) | 2005-06-05 | v Romania at Bucharest |
| 995 | Ben MacDougall | Centre | 2006-02-12 | v Wales at Millennium Stadium |
| 996 | Sam Pinder | (Scrum Half) | 2006-06-10 | v South Africa at Durban |
| 997 | Johnnie Beattie | No. 8 | 2006-11-11 | v Romania at Murrayfield |
| 998 | Rob Dewey | Centre | 2006-11-11 | v Romania at Murrayfield |
| 999 | David Callam | No.8 | 2006-11-11 | v Romania at Murrayfield |
| 1000 | Jim Hamilton | Lock | 2006-11-11 | v Romania at Murrayfield |
| 1001 | Rory Lawson | Scrum half | 2006-11-25 | v Australia at Murrayfield |
| 1002 | Alasdair Strokosch | (Flanker) | 2006-11-25 | v Australia at Murrayfield |
| 1003 | Fergus Thomson | Hooker | 2007-08-11 | v Ireland at Murrayfield |
| 1004 | John Barclay | Flanker | 2007-09-23 | v New Zealand at Murrayfield |
| 1005 | Alasdair Dickinson | Prop | 2007-09-23 | v New Zealand at Murrayfield |
| 1006 | Nick De Luca | Centre | 2008-02-03 | v France at Murrayfield |
| 1007 | Ross Rennie | Flanker | 2008-02-23 | v Ireland at Croke Park |
| 1008 | Ben Cairns | Centre | 2008-06-07 | v Argentina at Rosario |
| 1009 | Thom Evans | Wing | 2008-06-07 | v Argentina at Rosario |
| 1010 | Matt Mustchin | Lock | 2008-06-07 | v Argentina at Rosario |
| 1011 | Max Evans | Wing | 2008-11-22 | v Canada at Aberdeen |
| 1012 | Geoff Cross | Prop | 2009-02-08 | v Wales at Murrayfield |
| 1013 | Moray Low | (Prop) | 2009-02-14 | v France at Stade de France |
| 1014 | Alex Grove | Centre | 2009-11-14 | v Fiji at Murrayfield |
| 1015 | Kyle Traynor | Prop | 2009-11-14 | v Fiji at Murrayfield |
| 1016 | Richie Vernon | (No. 8) | 2009-11-14 | v Fiji at Murrayfield |
| 1017 | Alan MacDonald | Flanker | 2009-11-28 | v Argentina at Murrayfield |
| 1018 | Richie Gray | Lock | 2010-02-07 | v France at Murrayfield |
| 1019 | Greig Laidlaw | Scrum half | 2010-11-13 | v New Zealand at Murrayfield |
| 1020 | Ruaridh Jackson | Fly Half | 2010-11-13 | v New Zealand at Murrayfield |
| 1021 | Joe Ansbro | Centre | 2010-11-20 | v South Africa at Murrayfield |
| 1022 | Jack Cuthbert | Full back | 2011-08-06 | v Ireland at Murrayfield |
| 1023 | David Denton | No. 8 | 2011-08-06 | v Ireland at Murrayfield |
| 1024 | Lee Jones | Wing | 2012-02-04 | v England at Murrayfield |
| 1025 | Stuart Hogg | Full back | 2012-02-12 | v Wales at Millennium Stadium |
| 1026 | Ed Kalman | (Prop) | 2012-02-12 | v Wales at Millennium Stadium |
| 1027 | Duncan Weir | Fly Half | 2012-02-26 | v France at Murrayfield |
| 1028 | Matt Scott | (Wing) | 2012-03-10 | v Ireland at Lansdowne Road |
| 1029 | Jon Welsh | Prop | 2012-03-17 | v Italy at Rome |
| 1030 | Ryan Grant | Prop | 2012-06-05 | v Australia at Newcastle |
| 1031 | Tom Brown | (Wing) | 2012-06-05 | v Australia at Newcastle |
| 1032 | Tim Visser | Wing | 2012-06-16 | v Fiji at Lautoka |
| 1033 | Tom Ryder | Lock | 2012-06-16 | v Fiji at Lautoka |
| 1034 | Rob Harley | (No. 8) | 2012-06-23 | v Samoa at Apia |
| 1035 | Henry Pyrgos | Scrum half | 2012-11-11 | v New Zealand at Murrayfield |
| 1036 | Tom Heathcote | Fly Half | 2012-06-24 | v Tonga at Aberdeen |
| 1037 | Sean Maitland | Wing | 2013-02-02 | v England at Twickenham |
| 1038 | Ryan Wilson | (No. 8) | 2013-03-09 | v Wales at Murrayfield |
| 1039 | Grant Gilchrist | Lock | 2013-03-16 | v France at Stade de France |
| 1040 | Alex Dunbar | Centre | 2013-06-08 | v Samoa at Durban |
| 1041 | Pat MacArthur | Hooker | 2013-06-08 | v Samoa at Durban |
| 1042 | Greig Tonks | Full back | 2013-06-08 | v Samoa at Durban |
| 1043 | Peter Horne | (Fly Half) | 2013-06-08 | v Samoa at Durban |
| 1044 | Steven Lawrie | Hooker | 2013-06-08 | v Samoa at Durban |
| 1045 | Duncan Taylor | Centre | 2013-06-08 | v Samoa at Durban |
| 1046 | Peter Murchie | Fullback | 2013-06-15 | v South Africa at Nelspruit |
| 1047 | Tommy Seymour | Wing | 2013-06-15 | v South Africa at Nelspruit |
| 1048 | Tim Swinson | Lock | 2013-06-15 | v South Africa at Nelspruit |
| 1049 | Fraser Brown | (Hooker) | 2013-06-22 | v Italy at Pretoria |
| 1050 | Jonny Gray | Lock | 2013-11-17 | v South Africa at Murrayfield |
| 1051 | Kieran Low | (No. 8) | 2013-11-23 | v Australia at Murrayfield |
| 1052 | Chris Fusaro | Flanker | 2014-02-08 | v England at Murrayfield |
| 1053 | Dougie Fife | Wing | 2014-03-15 | v Wales at Millennium Stadium |
| 1054 | Blair Cowan | (Flanker) | 2014-06-07 | v USA in Houston |
| 1055 | Gordon Reid | Prop | 2014-06-07 | v USA in Houston |
| 1056 | Finn Russell | Fly Half | 2014-06-07 | v USA in Houston |
| 1057 | Alex Allan | Prop | 2014-06-07 | v USA in Houston |
| 1058 | Kevin Bryce | (No. 8) | 2014-06-14 | v Canada in Toronto |
| 1059 | Grayson Hart | Scrum half | 2014-06-14 | v Canada in Toronto |
| 1060 | Adam Ashe | No. 8 | 2014-06-28 | v South Africa in Port Elizabeth |
| 1061 | Tyrone Holmes | (Flanker) | 2014-06-28 | v South Africa in Port Elizabeth |
| 1062 | Mark Bennett | Centre | 2014-11-08 | v Argentina at Murrayfield |
| 1063 | Sam Hidalgo-Clyne | Scrum half | 2015-02-07 | v France at Stade de France |
| 1064 | Hamish Watson | Flanker | 2015-02-15 | v Italy at Murrayfield |
| 1065 | Ben Toolis | Lock | 2015-02-15 | v Italy at Murrayfield |
| 1066 | Hugh Blake | Flanker | 2015-08-15 | v Ireland at Aviva Stadium |
| 1067 | Michael Cusack | Prop | 2015-08-15 | v Ireland at Aviva Stadium |
| 1068 | Stuart McInally | (Hooker) | 2015-08-22 | v Italy at Stadio Olimpico di Torino |
| 1069 | John Hardie | Flanker | 2015-08-22 | v Italy at Stadio Olimpico di Torino |
| 1070 | Rory Hughes | Wing | 2015-08-22 | v Italy at Stadio Olimpico di Torino |
| 1071 | WP Nel | Prop | 2015-08-22 | v Italy at Stadio Olimpico di Torino |
| 1072 | Damien Hoyland | Wing | 2015-08-22 | v Italy at Stadio Olimpico di Torino |
| 1073 | Josh Strauss | (Flanker) | 2015-09-23 | v Japan at Kingsholm, Gloucester |
| 1074 | Zander Fagerson | Prop | 2016-02-06 | v England at Murrayfield |
| 1075 | Rory Sutherland | Prop | 2016-03-19 | v Ireland in Aviva Stadium |
| 1076 | Huw Jones | Centre | 2016-06-25 | v Japan at Ajinomoto Stadium, Tokyo |
| 1077 | Allan Dell | Prop | 2016-11-12 | v Australia at Murrayfield |
| 1078 | Magnus Bradbury | (Flanker) | 2016-11-19 | v Argentina at Murrayfield |
| 1079 | Ali Price | Scrum half | 2016-11-26 | v Georgia at Rugby Park |
| 1080 | Simon Berghan | (Prop) | 2017-02-12 | v France at Stade de France |
| 1081 | Cornell du Preez | (Flanker) | 2017-03-11 | v England at Twickenham |
| 1082 | Nick Grigg | Centre | 2017-06-24 | v Fiji at ANZ Stadium, Suva |
| 1083 | Darryl Marfo | Prop | 2017-11-11 | v Samoa at Murrayfield |
| 1084 | Jamie Bhatti | (Prop) | 2017-11-11 | v Samoa at Murrayfield |
| 1085 | Chris Harris | (Wing) | 2017-11-11 | v Samoa at Murrayfield |
| 1086 | George Turner | (Hooker) | 2017-11-11 | v Samoa at Murrayfield |
| 1087 | Luke Hamilton | (Flanker) | 2017-11-18 | v New Zealand at Murrayfield |
| 1088 | Byron McGuigan | (Wing) | 2017-11-18 | v New Zealand at Murrayfield |
| 1089 | Phil Burleigh | (Centre) | 2017-11-25 | v Australia at Murrayfield |
| 1090 | Murray McCallum | (Prop) | 2018-02-03 | v Wales at Millennium Stadium |
| 1091 | Blair Kinghorn | (Wing) | 2018-02-24 | v England at Murrayfield |
| 1092 | James Lang | Centre | 2018-06-09 | v Canada at Commonwealth Stadium, Edmonton |
| 1093 | Jamie Ritchie | Flanker | 2018-06-09 | v Canada at Commonwealth Stadium, Edmonton |
| 1094 | Adam Hastings | (Fly Half) | 2018-06-09 | v Canada at Commonwealth Stadium, Edmonton |
| 1095 | Lewis Carmichael | (Lock) | 2018-06-09 | v Canada at Commonwealth Stadium, Edmonton |
| 1096 | Matt Fagerson | No. 8 | 2018-06-16 | v USA at BBVA Compass Stadium, Houston |
| 1097 | George Horne | Scrum half | 2018-06-16 | v USA at BBVA Compass Stadium, Houston |
| 1098 | Darcy Graham | (Wing) | 2018-11-03 | v Wales at Principality Stadium |
| 1099 | Sam Skinner | Lock | 2018-11-10 | v Fiji at Murrayfield |
| 1100 | Sam Johnson | Centre | 2019-02-02 | v Italy at Murrayfield |
| 1101 | Jake Kerr | (Hooker) | 2019-02-02 | v Italy at Murrayfield |
| 1102 | Gary Graham | (Flanker) | 2019-02-02 | v Italy at Murrayfield |
| 1103 | D'Arcy Rae | (Prop) | 2019-02-09 | v Ireland at Murrayfield |
| 1104 | Scott Cummings | (Lock) | 2019-08-17 | v France at Nice |
| 1105 | Rory Hutchinson | (Centre) | 2019-08-17 | v France at Nice |
| 1106 | Blade Thomson | (No. 8) | 2019-08-24 | v France at Murrayfield |
| 1107 | Grant Stewart | (Hooker) | 2019-02-09 | v France at Murrayfield |
| 1108 | Nick Haining | No. 8 | 2020-02-01 | v Ireland at Aviva Stadium |
| 1109 | Kyle Steyn | (Wing) | 2020-03-08 | v France at Murrayfield |
| 1110 | Duhan van der Merwe | Wing | 2020-10-23 | v Georgia at Murrayfield |
| 1111 | Oli Kebble | (Prop) | 2020-10-23 | v Georgia at Murrayfield |
| 1112 | Scott Steele | (Wing) | 2020-10-31 | v Wales at Parc y Scarlets |
| 1113 | Jaco van der Walt | Fly Half | 2020-12-05 | v Ireland at Aviva Stadium |
| 1114 | Cameron Redpath | Centre | 2021-02-06 | v England at Twickenham Stadium |
| 1115 | Dave Cherry | (Hooker) | 2021-02-06 | v England at Twickenham Stadium |
| 1116 | Alex Craig | (Lock) | 2021-03-21 | v Italy at Murrayfield Stadium |
| 1117 | Jamie Hodgson | Lock | 2021-10-30 | v Tonga at Murrayfield Stadium |
| 1118 | Rufus McLean | Wing | 2021-10-30 | v Tonga at Murrayfield Stadium |
| 1119 | Pierre Schoeman | Prop | 2021-10-30 | v Tonga at Murrayfield Stadium |
| 1120 | Sione Tuipulotu | Centre | 2021-10-30 | v Tonga at Murrayfield Stadium |
| 1121 | Luke Crosbie | (Flanker) | 2021-10-30 | v Tonga at Murrayfield Stadium |
| 1122 | Jamie Dobie | (Scrum Half) | 2021-10-30 | v Tonga at Murrayfield Stadium |
| 1123 | Marshall Sykes | (Lock) | 2021-10-30 | v Tonga at Murrayfield Stadium |
| 1124 | Ross Thompson | (Fly Half) | 2021-10-30 | v Tonga at Murrayfield Stadium |
| 1125 | Ewan Ashman | (Hooker) | 2021-11-07 | v Australia at Murrayfield Stadium |
| 1126 | Josh Bayliss | (Flanker) | 2021-11-07 | v Australia at Murrayfield Stadium |
| 1127 | Javan Sebastian | (Prop) | 2021-11-20 | v Japan at Murrayfield Stadium |
| 1128 | Dylan Richardson | (Flanker) | 2021-11-20 | v Japan at Murrayfield Stadium |
| 1129 | Ben White | (Scrum Half) | 2022-02-05 | v England at Murrayfield Stadium |
| 1130 | Rory Darge | (Flanker) | 2022-02-12 | v Wales at Principality Stadium |
| 1131 | Andy Christie | (Flanker) | 2022-02-26 | v France at Murrayfield Stadium |
| 1132 | Ben Vellacott | (Scrum Half) | 2022-03-12 | v Italy at Stadio Olimpico |
| 1133 | Kyle Rowe | (Wing) | 2022-07-09 | v Argentina at Estadio Padre Ernesto Martearena |
| 1134 | Ollie Smith | Full back | 2022-07-16 | v Argentina at Estadio Único Madre de Ciudades |
| 1135 | Glen Young | (Lock) | 2022-07-16 | v Argentina at Estadio Único Madre de Ciudades |
| 1136 | Jack Dempsey | (No. 8) | 2022-10-29 | v Australia at Murrayfield Stadium |
| 1137 | Murphy Walker | (Prop) | 2022-11-05 | v Fiji at Murrayfield Stadium |
| 1138 | Ben Healy | (Fly Half) | 2023-03-18 | v Italy at Murrayfield Stadium |
| 1139 | Stafford McDowall | Centre | 2023-07-29 | v Italy at Murrayfield Stadium |
| 1140 | Cameron Henderson | (Lock) | 2023-07-29 | v Italy at Murrayfield Stadium |
| 1141 | Alexander Buchanan | (Flanker) | 1942-03-21 | v England at Inverleith |
| 1142 | Morris Dewar | Scrum Half | 1942-03-21 | v England at Inverleith |
| 1143 | Ewan Douglas | Wing | 1942-03-21 | v England at Inverleith |
| 1144 | Stanley Harper | No. 8 | 1942-03-21 | v England at Inverleith |
| 1145 | Eric Hunter | Centre | 1942-03-21 | v England at Inverleith |
| 1146 | Jimmy Maltman | Prop | 1942-03-21 | v England at Inverleith |
| 1147 | Neil William Ramsay | Prop | 1942-03-21 | v England at Inverleith |
| 1148 | Jake McNeil | No. 8 | 1942-04-11 | v England at Inverleith |
| 1149 | Dennis Arthur Roberts | Centre | 1942-04-11 | v England at Inverleith |
| 1150 | James Michael Blair | Scrum Half | 1943-02-27 | v England at Inverleith |
| 1151 | Robert Cowe | Lock | 1943-02-27 | v England at Inverleith |
| 1152 | Colin McLay | Flanker | 1943-02-27 | v England at Inverleith |
| 1153 | William Gibson Biggart | Centre | 1943-04-10 | v England at Leicester |
| 1154 | Eric Grant | Wing | 1943-04-10 | v England at Leicester |
| 1155 | Matthew Kennedy | Wing | 1943-04-10 | v England at Leicester |
| 1156 | Alec Elliot Murray | Wing | 1944-02-26 | v England at Murrayfield Stadium |
| 1157 | Jock McClure | Prop | 1944-03-18 | v England at Murrayfield Stadium |
| 1158 | Henry Uren | Wing | 1944-03-18 | v England at Murrayfield Stadium |
| 1159 | Drew Barcroft | Hooker | 1945-02-24 | v England at Murrayfield Stadium |
| 1160 | Jim Henderson | Centre | 1945-02-24 | v England at Murrayfield Stadium |
| 1161 | Rod MacKenzie | Lock | 1945-02-24 | v England at Murrayfield Stadium |
| 1162 | J. B. Nicholls | Wing | 1945-02-24 | v England at Murrayfield Stadium |
| 1163 | Jake Thom | Prop | 1945-02-24 | v England at Murrayfield Stadium |
| 1164 | Charlie Wilhelm | Lock | 1945-02-24 | v England at Murrayfield Stadium |
| 1165 | Erik Arne Melling | Flanker | 1945-03-17 | v England at Murrayfield Stadium |
| 1166 | John Anderson | Wing | 1946-01-19 | v New Zealand Army at Murrayfield Stadium |
| 1167 | John Kirk | Lock | 1946-01-19 | v New Zealand Army at Murrayfield Stadium |
| 1168 | Kenneth Wilson | Scrum Half | 1946-03-16 | v England at Murrayfield Stadium |
| 1169 | Ian Murchie | Wing | 1969-09-13 | v Argentina at Murrayfield Stadium |
| 1170 | Arthur Orr | Wing | 1969-09-13 | v Argentina at Murrayfield Stadium |
| 1171 | Bruce Laidlaw | Wing | 1969-09-27 | v Argentina at Murrayfield Stadium |
| 1172 | David Ashton | Wing | 1976-09-25 | v Japan at Murrayfield Stadium |
| 1173 | Jim Carswell | Lock | 1976-09-25 | v Japan at Murrayfield Stadium |
| 1174 | Colin Mair | Wing | 1977-09-18 | v Japan at Murrayfield Stadium |
| 1175 | Rob Moffat | Wing | 1977-09-18 | v Japan at Murrayfield Stadium |
| 1176 | Stuart Johnson | Wing | 1986-05-01 | v Spain at Murrayfield Stadium |
| 1177 | Gary Waite | Wing | 1986-05-01 | v Spain at Murrayfield Stadium |
| 1178 | Julian Scott | Scrum half | 1986-05-07 | v France at Murrayfield Stadium |
| 1179 | Simon Scott | Centre | 1986-05-07 | v France at Murrayfield Stadium |
| 1180 | Tim Exeter | Centre | 1987-09-26 | v France at Murrayfield Stadium |
| 1181 | Jeremy Macklin | Flanker | 1987-09-26 | v France at Murrayfield Stadium |
| 1182 | Ian Ramsey | Wing | 1987-09-26 | v France at Murrayfield Stadium |
| 1183 | David Butcher | Prop | 1988-05-21 | v Zimbabwe at Murrayfield Stadium |
| 1184 | Ruari Maclean | Centre | 1988-05-21 | v Zimbabwe at Murrayfield Stadium |
| 1185 | Stewart McAslan | Wing | 1988-05-21 | v Zimbabwe at Murrayfield Stadium |
| 1186 | Kevin Rafferty | Flanker | 1988-05-21 | v Zimbabwe at Murrayfield Stadium |
| 1187 | Hugh Parker | No. 8 | 1988-05-21 | v Zimbabwe at Murrayfield Stadium |
| 1188 | Grant Wilson | Prop | 1989-06-28 | v Japan at Murrayfield Stadium |
| 1189 | Mark Moncrieff | Full Back | 1991-05-18 | v USA at Murrayfield Stadium |
| 1190 | Ronnie Kirkpatrick | Flanker | 1991-05-25 | v Canada at Canada Games Stadium |
| 1191 | Ally Donaldson | Wing | 1993-03-29 | v Fiji at Murrayfield Stadium |
| 1192 | Steve Ferguson | Wing | 1993-03-29 | v Fiji at Murrayfield Stadium |
| 1193 | Nick Grecian | Wing | 1993-03-29 | v Fiji at Murrayfield Stadium |
| 1194 | Gary Isaac | Prop | 1993-03-29 | v Fiji at Murrayfield Stadium |
| 1195 | Robb Scott | Wing | 1993-03-29 | v Fiji at Murrayfield Stadium |
| 1196 | Craig Redpath | Centre | 1993-06-05 | v Tonga at Murrayfield Stadium |
| 1197 | Willie Anderson | Prop | 1998-12-05 | v Spain at Murrayfield Stadium |
| 1198 | Donald Maltman | Hooker | 1943-02-27 | v England at Inverleith |
| 1199 | Richie Dixon | Flanker | 1974-03-30 | v Netherlands at Hughenden Stadium |
| 1200 | Alan Friell | Centre | 1974-03-30 | v Netherlands at Hughenden Stadium |
| 1201 | Bob Haldane | Flanker | 1974-03-30 | v Netherlands at Hughenden Stadium |
| 1202 | Jack Shirley | Flanker | 1974-03-30 | v Netherlands at Hughenden Stadium |
| 1203 | George Telfer | Wing | 1974-03-30 | v Netherlands at Hughenden Stadium |
| 1204 | George Turnbull | Centre | 1974-03-30 | v Netherlands at Hughenden Stadium |
| 1205 | George Watson | Lock | 1974-03-30 | v Netherlands at Hughenden Stadium |
| 1206 | Wat Davies | Flanker | 1975-10-19 | v Netherlands at Hilversum |
| 1207 | Colin Galbraith | Lock | 1975-10-19 | v Netherlands at Hilversum |
| 1208 | Hugh McHardy | Scrum Half | 1975-10-19 | v Netherlands at Hilversum |
| 1209 | Ken Trotter | Wing | 1975-10-19 | v Netherlands at Hilversum |
| 1210 | Bruce White | Wing | 1978-10-01 | v Netherlands at Hilversum |
| 1211 | Andy Dougall | Centre | 1979-10-01 | v Netherlands at Hilversum |
| 1212 | Donald McLeod | Flanker | 1978-10-01 | v Netherlands at Hilversum |
| 1213 | John Robertson | Wing | 1978-10-01 | v Netherlands at Hilversum |
| 1214 | Craig Williamson | Centre | 1978-10-01 | v Netherlands at Hilversum |
| 1215 | Ken Macaulay | Lock | 1980-04-26 | v France at Bordeaux |
| 1216 | Johnny Matthews | Hooker | 2023-09-30 | v Romania at Stade Pierre-Mauroy |
| 1217 | Alec Hepburn | Prop | 2024-02-03 | v Wales at Millennium Stadium |
| 1218 | Elliot Millar-Mills | Prop | 2024-02-03 | v Wales at Millennium Stadium |
| 1219 | Harry Paterson | Full Back | 2024-02-11 | v France at Murrayfield |
| 1220 | Max Williamson | Lock | 2024-07-06 | v Canada at TD Place Stadium |
| 1221 | Gregor Brown | Flanker | 2024-07-06 | v Canada at TD Place Stadium |
| 1222 | Gus Warr | Scrum Half | 2024-07-06 | v Canada at TD Place Stadium |
| 1223 | Arron Reed | Wing | 2024-07-06 | v Canada at TD Place Stadium |
| 1224 | Matt Currie | Centre | 2024-07-06 | v Canada at TD Place Stadium |
| 1225 | Nathan McBeth | (Prop) | 2024-07-06 | v Canada at TD Place Stadium |
| 1226 | Will Hurd | (Prop) | 2024-07-06 | v Canada at TD Place Stadium |
| 1227 | Robbie Smith | (Hooker) | 2024-07-06 | v Canada at TD Place Stadium |
| 1228 | Ewan Johnson | (Lock) | 2024-07-06 | v Canada at TD Place Stadium |
| 1229 | Ross McCann | (Wing) | 2024-07-06 | v Canada at TD Place Stadium |
| 1230 | Patrick Harrison | (Hooker) | 2024-07-20 | v Chile at Estadio Nacional Julio Martínez Prádanos |
| 1231 | Tom Jordan | (Full Back) | 2024-11-01 | v Fiji at Murrayfield Stadium |
| 1232 | Ben Muncaster | Flanker | 2024-11-16 | v Portugal at Murrayfield Stadium |
| 1233 | Alex Samuel | Lock | 2024-11-16 | v Portugal at Murrayfield Stadium |
| 1234 | Freddy Douglas | Flanker | 2024-11-16 | v Portugal at Murrayfield Stadium |
| 1235 | Fergus Burke | (Fly Half) | 2025-07-12 | v Fiji at HFC Bank Stadium |
| 1236 | Fin Richardson | Prop | 2025-07-18 | v Samoa at Eden Park |
| 1237 | Liam McConnell | Flanker | 2025-11-01 | v USA at Murrayfield Stadium |
| 1238 | Harri Morris | (Hooker) | 2025-11-01 | v USA at Murrayfield Stadium |
| 1239 | Gregor Hiddleston | (Hooker) | 2026-07-04 | v Argentina at Estadio Mario Kempes |
| 1240 | Seb Stephen | (Hooker) | 2026-07-18 | v Fiji at Murrayfield Stadium |
