= Reginald Langrish =

Scotland international rugby union player

- Full name: Reginald Walter Langrish
- Born: 1 December 1905
- Died: 15 March 1986 (aged 80) St Austell, England

Rugby union career
- Position: Fullback
International career
Years	Team	Apps	(Points)
1930–31	Scotland	4	(0)

Reginald Walter Langrish (1 December 1905 — 15 March 1986) was a Scottish international rugby union player.

A London Scottish fullback, Langrish gained four Scotland caps during his career. He was the first fullback tried as a successor to Dan Drysdale, playing the opening 1930 Five Nations match in Paris, but struggled against the French and lost his place to Ronald Warren for the remainder of the tournament. In 1931, Langrish got recalled by Scotland and played three of their Five Nations matches.

Langrish was an officer in the Royal Air Force.

== See also ==
- List of Scotland national rugby union players
