= Micky Grant =

Scotland international rugby union player

- Full name: Malcolm Leith Grant
- Born: 8 November 1927 Norwich, England
- Died: 29 October 1992 (aged 64) Edinburgh, Scotland

Rugby union career
- Position: Centre / Fly-half
International career
Years	Team	Apps	(Points)
1955–57	Scotland	4	(0)

Malcolm Leith "Micky" Grant (8 November 1927 — 29 October 1992) was a Scottish international rugby union player.

Born in Norwich, Grant was a centre three-quarter with London club Harlequins, where he formed a strong backline with England internationals Ricky Barlett and Phil Davies.

Grant, who had a Scottish father, gained four Scotland caps in intermittent appearances from 1955 to 1957. He debuted as a centre, but played his remaining matches at fly-half.

Edinburgh Academical and Scotland centre Pat Burnet was his brother-in-law.

== See also ==
- List of Scotland national rugby union players
