= John Sweet (rugby union) =

- Full name: John Burton Sweet
- Born: 26 March 1892
- Died: 27 February 1943 (aged 50)

Rugby union career
- Position: Wing
International career
Years	Team	Apps	(Points)
1913–14	Scotland	2	(0)

John Burton Sweet (26 March 1892 – 27 February 1943) was a Scottish international rugby union player.

A native of Ayrshire, Sweet was the son of a banker and nephew of a former Irvine provost (mayor). He attended Glasgow High School and studied medicine at the University of Glasgow, where he was active in rugby.

Sweet was capped twice for Scotland, debuting as a wing three–quarter against England in 1913.

At the beginning of World War I, Sweet joined the Royal Scots Fusiliers and was sent to the front in 1915. He received a promotion to lieutenant while in the field and was injured during fighting at Ypres. Two of his brothers also served.

== See also ==
- List of Scotland national rugby union players
