= Richard Aitkin =

Scotland international rugby union player

Richard Aitken
- Born: 29 June 1914 Dunbar, Scotland
- Died: North Berwick, Scotland

Rugby union career
- Position: Prop
International career
Years	Team	Apps	(Points)
1947	Scotland	1	(0)

Richard Aitken was a Scottish international rugby union player.

Aitken served in the Royal Navy and joined London Scottish in 1945 after being posted to Nore Command. A tireless prop, Aitken featured in the Victory Internationals, before earning his solitary Scotland cap in 1947, playing a Five Nations match against Wales at Murrayfield. He was subsequently sent on overseas service with the Navy.

== See also ==
- List of Scotland national rugby union players
