= John Brash (rugby union) =

Scottish rugby union player

- Full name: John Craig Brash
- Born: 1939
- Died: 4 December 2007
- School: Fettes College
- University: University of Cambridge

Rugby union career
- Position: Back-row
International career
Years	Team	Apps	(Points)
1961	Scotland	1	(0)

John Craig Brash (1939 – 2007) was a Scottish international rugby union player.

Brash attended Fettes College in Edinburgh and was a Scotland Schoolboys representative captain.

Brash was awarded three blues at Cambridge University and gained one Scotland cap, deputising for an injured Mike Campbell-Lamerton in the back-row against England at Twickenham during the 1961 Five Nations.

== See also ==
- List of Scotland national rugby union players
