= Hugh Martin (rugby union) =

- Born: 9 April 1888 Edinburgh, Scotland
- Died: 6 January 1970 (aged 81)
- University: University of Oxford

Rugby union career
- Position: Wing
International career
Years	Team	Apps	(Points)
1908–09	Scotland	5	(3)

Hugh Martin (9 April 1888 – 6 January 1970) was a Scottish international rugby union player.

Martin was a lightly built and pacy wing three–quarter.

A three–time Oxford rugby blue, Martin is the only person to have twice scored a hat–trick in The Varsity Match. He scored three tries in the 1907 Varsity Match, then bettered that by crossing for four tries in 1909. The latter feat was overshadowed by teammate Ronald Poulton, who managed five tries in the same match. He was capped five times for Scotland and scored one try, with his appearances encompassing the 1908 and 1909 Home Nations Championships.

Martin relocated to Shanghai prior to World War I.

== See also ==
- List of Scotland national rugby union players
