= George Ledingham =

George Ledingham DSO MC
- Full name: George Alexander Ledingham
- Born: 6 March 1890 Aberdeen, Scotland
- Died: 8 November 1978 (aged 88) Rhodesia

Rugby union career
- Position: Forward
International career
Years	Team	Apps	(Points)
1913	Scotland	1	(0)

Colonel George Alexander Ledingham (6 March 1890 – 8 November 1978) was a British Army officer and Scottish international rugby union player.

Ledingham was born in Aberdeen and educated at Aberdeen Grammar School.

A forward, Ledingham played for Aberdeen and was capped for Scotland in a 1913 Five Nations match against France in Paris. He also had the distinction of captaining United Services against the touring 1917 Springboks.

Ledingham was a commander with the Surrey and Sussex Yeomanry during World War II. He was decorated with a D.S.O. in 1940, On the liberation of South Brabant in 1944, Ledingham served as commander of their Military Government and was later secretary general of the United Nations War Crimes Commission.

== See also ==
- List of Scotland national rugby union players
