= Jimmy MacDonald (rugby union) =

Scotland international rugby union player

- Full name: James Stirling MacDonald
- Born: 15 July 1879 Stellenbosch, South Africa
- Died: 27 April 1925 (aged 45) Stellenbosch, South Africa
- University: University of Edinburgh

Rugby union career
- Position: Wing
International career
Years	Team	Apps	(Points)
1903–05	Scotland	5	(10)

James Stirling MacDonald (15 July 1879 – 27 April 1925) was a Scotland international rugby union player.

MacDonald came from Stellenbosch in South Africa and was capped for Scotland as a varsity rugby player at the University of Edinburgh, where he studied medicine. He was a wing three–quarter and could also be utilised as a goal–kicker. Capped five times, MacDonald scored one of Scotland's two tries, and had another disallowed, in their 6–3 Calcutta Cup win over England in 1904. This win also secured Scotland the Home Nations title.

== See also ==
- List of Scotland national rugby union players
