= Ken Ross (rugby union) =

- Full name: Kenneth Innes Ross
- Born: 15 March 1937 Folkestone, Kent, England
- Died: 25 July 2021 (aged 84)
- School: Boroughmuir High School
- Occupation: Whisky broker

Rugby union career
- Position: Wing-forward
International career
Years	Team	Apps	(Points)
1961–63	Scotland	11	(6)

Kenneth Innes Ross (15 March 1937 — 25 July 2021) was a Scottish international rugby union player.

Born into a Scottish family in Folkestone, Kent, Ross was educated at Boroughmuir High School in Edinburgh, where he got his start in rugby at age 15 and went on to captain the first XV for two seasons.

Ross, a wing-forward, played with Boroughmuir FPs throughout his career. He won seven championships with Edinburgh District, which he was first selected for at 19. In 1957, Ross represented Combined Cities against the touring Wallabies.

During national service, Ross attended Dartmouth Naval College and joined the Royal Marines. He played for Hampshire, Devonport Services, the Royal Navy and United Services, before returning to Scotland in 1960.

Ross gained 11 Scotland caps from 1961 to 1963. On debut against the Springboks at Murrayfield, Ross became Boroughmuir's first international, then in his third match played a role in a win over Ireland with two tries. He played in Scotland's match against Wales in 1962 where they secured their first win in Cardiff for 35 years.

A whisky broker, Ross worked for Stanley P Morrison.

== See also ==
- List of Scotland national rugby union players
