= Nim Campbell =

- Full name: Norman MacDonald Campbell
- Born: 23 September 1929 Tylorstown, Rhondda, Wales
- Died: 22 September 2012 (aged 82) Worthing, Sussex, England
- School: Sherborne School
- University: University of London
- Occupation: Doctor

Rugby union career
- Position: Scrum-half
International career
Years	Team	Apps	(Points)
1956	Scotland	2	(0)

Norman MacDonald "Nim" Campbell (23 September 1929 — 22 September 2012) was a Scottish international rugby union player of the 1950s.

Campbell was born in Tylorstown, Wales, where his Scottish father worked as a schoolteacher. He attended Sherborne School in Dorset and played his rugby in London, having moved to the city for his medical studies.

A scrum-half, Campbell competed for London Scottish and the St Mary's Hospital side. He gained two Scotland caps in the 1956 Five Nations, against France at Murrayfield and Wales at Cardiff Arms Park.

Campbell practiced medicine in Worthing, Sussex.

== See also ==
- List of Scotland national rugby union players
