= Jock Stewart (rugby union) =

Jock Stewart MC
- Full name: John Livingstone Stewart
- Born: 6 May 1894 Hawick, Scotland
- Died: 6 August 1971 (aged 77) South Africa

Rugby union career
- Position: Wing-forward
International career
Years	Team	Apps	(Points)
1921	Scotland	1	(0)

John Livingstone Stewart (6 May 1894 — 6 August 1971) was a Scottish international rugby union player.

Born in Hawick, Stewart was the son of a minister and during his teenage years moved to Edinburgh.

Stewart served as an officer in the Argyll and Sutherland Highlanders during World War I, suffering a gun shot wound to his shoulder in the Second Battle of Arras. He was awarded the Military Cross in 1918.

A strongly-built forward, Stewart played his rugby for Edinburgh Academicals. He was capped once for Scotland, appearing as wing-forward against Ireland at Lansdowne Road during the 1921 Five Nations tournament.

Stewart was a veterinarian and lived for 26 years in Ghana through his work in the Colonial service. During this period he helped to vaccinate cattle to prevent an outbreak of the deadly rinderpest disease and was involved in assisting local farmers with cattle breeding. He lived the remainder of his life in South Africa.

== See also ==
- List of Scotland national rugby union players
