= Alan Sharp (rugby union) =

Scotland international rugby union player

- Full name: Alan Victor Sharp
- Born: 17 October 1969 (age 57) Bristol, England
- Height: 5 ft 10 in (178 cm)
- Weight: 242 lb (110 kg)

Rugby union career
- Position: Prop
International career
Years	Team	Apps	(Points)
1994	Scotland	6	(0)

Alan Victor Sharp (born 17 October 1969) is a British former rugby union international who represented Scotland.

A native of Bristol, Sharp was a Scotland representative at underage level but had also toured with England B, prior to his call up to the Scottish national team. He qualified as a Scotland player through his Scottish grandmother.

In 1994 he featured in six Test matches for Scotland as a prop, debuting against England at Murrayfield.

Sharp played his club rugby for the Bristol Bears, Clifton and Coventry.

Sharp is now forwards coach at Bishopston RFC

== See also ==
- List of Scotland national rugby union players
