= Ian Robertson (rugby union, born 1887) =

- Full name: Ian Peter Macintosh Robertson
- Born: 3 February 1887 Edinburgh, Scotland
- Died: 9 May 1949 (aged 62) Toronto, Canada

Rugby union career
- Position: Wing
International career
Years	Team	Apps	(Points)
1910	Scotland	1	(6)

Ian Peter Macintosh Robertson (3 February 1887 – 9 May 1949) is a Scottish international rugby union player.

Robertson was educated at George Watson's College in Edinburgh and played rugby for Watsonian FC.

A wing three-quarter, Robertson made his international debut in Scotland's 1910 Five Nations Championship opener against France at Inverleith. He was aided by having Watsonian teammates in the three–quarter line and contributed two tries in a 27–0 Scotland win. This remained his only cap for Scotland.

Robertson moved to Canada in 1911 and became partner in an accounting firm.

== See also ==
- List of Scotland national rugby union players
