= Stewart Coltman =

- Born: 27 March 1920 Hawick, Scotland
- Died: 21 July 1999 (aged 79) Hawick, Scotland

Rugby union career
- Position: Prop
International career
Years	Team	Apps	(Points)
1948–49	Scotland	5	(0)

Stewart Coltman (27 March 1920 – 21 July 1999) was a Scottish international rugby union player.

Coltman was a native of Hawick and served as an officer with the King's Own Scottish Borderers in World War II.

A 14–stone prop, Coltman was strong scrummager and in the immediate post war years played for Hawick RFC, which he captained for a season. He gained five Scotland caps across the 1948 and 1949 Five Nations.

Coltman retired in 1950 after taking up a position with a knitwear company in New York City.

== See also ==
- List of Scotland national rugby union players
