= Jim Nichol =

Scottish rugby player (1932–2003)

- Full name: James Alastair Nichol
- Born: 12 February 1932 Edinburgh, Scotland
- Died: 22 November 2003 (aged 71)

Rugby union career
- Position: Scrum-half
International career
Years	Team	Apps	(Points)
1955	Scotland	3	(3)

James Alastair Nichol (12 February 1932 – 22 November 2003) was a Scottish international rugby union player.

A scrum-half for Royal HSFP, Nichol was one of the fastest players in Scottish rugby at the time and possessed strong wrists, honed by his practise routine of using a ball filled with wet sand.

Nichol gained three Scotland caps during the 1955 Five Nations, scoring a try to help defeat Wales on his debut match at Murrayfield. He struggled for form the following season and did not receive any further opportunities.

== See also ==
- List of Scotland national rugby union players
