= Gully Wilson =

- Full name: Graham Alexander Wilson
- Born: 23 November 1922
- Died: September 1998 (aged 75)
- Height: 6 ft 2 in (188 cm)
- Weight: 14 st (196 lb; 89 kg)
- School: Oundle School
- University: University of Oxford

Rugby union career
- Position: Lock
International career
Years	Team	Apps	(Points)
1949	Scotland	3	(3)

Graham Alexander Wilson (23 November 1922 — September 1998) was a Scottish international rugby union player.

Wilson attended Oundle School in Northamptonshire, where he was captain of the cricket and rugby sides. He served on a destroyer with the Royal Navy in World War II.

A second-row forward, Wilson was awarded three blues at Oxford University and led them to a win in the 1948 Varsity Match. He played for Scotland during the 1949 Five Nations, appearing against France, Wales and England. In 1951, Wilson was appointed captain of Birkenhead Park.

== See also ==
- List of Scotland national rugby union players
