= Bill MacLennan =

Scotland international rugby union player

- Full name: William Donald MacLennan
- Born: 4 April 1921 Edinburgh, Scotland
- Died: 29 September 2002 (aged 81) Haddington, Scotland

Rugby union career
- Position: Wing
International career
Years	Team	Apps	(Points)
1947	Scotland	2	(0)

William Donald MacLennan (4 April 1921 — 29 September 2002) was a Scottish paediatric surgeon and international rugby union player of the 1940s.

MacLennan was born and raised in Edinburgh. He attended George Watson's College, then obtained combined degrees in medicine and dental surgery at the Royal College of Surgeons of Edinburgh and Royal College of Physicians and Surgeons of Glasgow, before postgraduate studies at Columbia University in New York.

A wing three-quarter, MacLennan played rugby for the Navy during his war service and was capped twice for Scotland in the 1947 Five Nations, against France at Colombes and Ireland at Murrayfield.

MacLennan was a pioneering paediatric oral and maxillofacial surgeon. He authored over 40 scientific papers, was appointed Foundation Chair of Oral Surgery at the University of Edinburgh and served as President of The British Association of Oral and Maxillofacial Surgeons.

== See also ==
- List of Scotland national rugby union players
