= Jo Hume =

Scotland international rugby union player

- Full name: John William Gardner Hume
- Born: 13 June 1906 Willesden, Middlesex, England
- Died: 23 March 1976 (aged 69)
- School: Mill Hill School
- University: Merton College, Oxford

Rugby union career
- Position: Centre
International career
| Years | Team | Apps | (Points) |
| 1928–30 | Scotland | 2 | (0) |

John William Gardner Hume (13 June 1906 — 23 March 1976) was a Scottish international rugby union player.

Born and raised in London, Hume was educated at Mill Hill School, where he learned his rugby, while also gaining colours for cricket and hockey. He attended Merton College, Oxford, winning blues in the 1927 and 1928 Varsity Matches. Of Scottish descent, Hume was capped twice for Scotland as a centre three-quarter. He also represented Middlesex.

Hume served as a captain in the Royal Armoured Corps during World War II and was held as a German prisoner of war.

== See also ==
- List of Scotland national rugby union players
