= Jimmy Lees =

- Full name: James Blanch Lees
- Born: 11 August 1919 Selkirk, Scotland
- Died: 22 August 2004 (aged 85) Galashiels, Scotland

Rugby union career
- Position: Back-row
International career
Years	Team	Apps	(Points)
1947–48	Scotland	5	(0)

James Blanch Lees (11 August 1919 — 22 August 2004) was a Scottish international rugby union player.

Raised in Selkirk, Lees was a back-forward forward, who had a good dribble kick and excelled in line-outs. He played his rugby with Gala in the Scottish Borders, while during his wartime service competed for the Army. In 1947 and 1948, Lees gained five Scotland caps, including a Calcutta Cup win over England, before retiring from the sport in 1952.

== See also ==
- List of Scotland national rugby union players
