= William Watherston =

- Full name: William Rory Andrews Watherston
- Born: 5 March 1933 Ford, Midlothian, Scotland
- Died: 6 May 2025 (aged 92) Australia
- School: Sherborne School

Rugby union career
- Position: Wing-forward
International career
Years	Team	Apps	(Points)
1963	Scotland	3	(0)

William Rory Andrews Watherston (5 March 1933 – 6 May 2025) was a Scottish international rugby union player.

Born in Ford, Midlothian, Watherston is the son of a farmer and attended Sherborne School.

Watherston, a wing-forward, played for Edinburgh Wanderers and London Scottish. He won his Scotland call up from the latter, gaining three caps during the 1963 Five Nations, and was also captain of Middlesex.

Watherston later emigrated to Australia. He died there on 6 May 2025, at the age of 92.

== See also ==
- List of Scotland national rugby union players
