= George Maxwell (rugby union) =

- Full name: Georgius Henry Hope Patrick Maxwell
- Born: 18 October 1892 Edinburgh, Scotland
- Died: 21 February 1961 (aged 68)

Rugby union career
- Position: Wing-forward
International career
Years	Team	Apps	(Points)
1913–22	Scotland	13	(7)

Georgius Henry Hope Patrick Maxwell (18 October 1892 – 21 February 1961) was a Scottish international rugby union player active in the early 20th century.

Maxwell was a sizeable wing-forward known for his temperament when it came to big matches. He had a tendency to catch with only one hand, which could make his ball gathering unreliable, and was used as an occasional goal–kicker. Capped 13 times for Scotland, Maxwell featured in international rugby both sides of World War I, from the 1913 Five Nations to his last appearance in the 1922 Calcutta Cup. He played club rugby for Edinburgh Academicals, London Scottish and the Royal Air Force.

== See also ==
- List of Scotland national rugby union players
