= John Crawford (rugby union) =

- Full name: John Archibald Crawford
- Born: 20 November 1910 Kensington, London, England
- Died: 10 January 1973 (aged 62) Chelsea, London, England

Rugby union career
- Position: Wing
International career
Years	Team	Apps	(Points)
1934	Scotland	1	(3)

John Archibald Crawford (20 November 1910 — 10 January 1973) was a Scottish international rugby union player.

Crawford was born in Kensington and attended Pembroke College, Cambridge. He played his early rugby with Cheltenham, as well as for Cambridge University, but didn't gain a blue.

A Royal Engineers lieutenant, Crawford made his name as a strong running wing three-quarter for the Army during the early 1930s, notably scoring four of their five tries in a 1933 match against the Navy. His solitary Scotland cap came the following year against Ireland at Murrayfield and he contributed a try in the 16–9 win. He also played for London Scottish.

== See also ==
- List of Scotland national rugby union players
