= William Dobson (rugby union) =

- Full name: William Goldie Dobson
- Born: 9 February 1894
- Died: 11 March 1973 (aged 79)

Rugby union career
- Position: Front row forward
International career
Years	Team	Apps	(Points)
1922	Scotland	3	(0)

William Goldie Dobson (9 February 1894 – 11 March 1973) was a Scottish international rugby union player.

Dobson was educated at George Heriot's School.

A weighty forward, Dobson played his rugby with Heriot's FP and in 1922 became the first from the club to be capped for Scotland. He gained a total of three caps. After being reserve for Scotland's 1922 Five Nations opener in Paris, Dobson played all three remaining championship fixtures, but was thereafter overlooked.

== See also ==
- List of Scotland national rugby union players
