= Alexander Walker (rugby union) =

- Full name: Alexander William Walker
- Born: 25 October 1908 Irvine, Ayrshire, Scotland
- Died: 26 January 1976 (aged 67) Bournemouth, England
- University: University of Cambridge
- Occupation: Businessman

Rugby union career
- Position: Forward
International career
| Years | Team | Apps | (Points) |
| 1931–32 | Scotland | 5 | (0) |

Alexander William Walker (25 October 1908 – 26 January 1976) was a Scottish international rugby union player.

Born in Irvine, Ayrshire, Walker was a Cambridge blue and also played rugby for Birkenhead Park. He gained five Scotland caps from 1931 to 1932, utilised as both a second row and back row forward.

Walker served with the Royal Air Force Volunteer Reserve in World War II, attaining the rank of wing-commander.

A prominent Liverpool businessman, Walker was a member of the executive committee of the Liverpool Chamber of Commerce. He held the chairmanship of Lever Brothers Pakistan and Unilever Merseyside Ltd.

== See also ==
- List of Scotland national rugby union players
