= Robert Smith (rugby union, born 1907) =

- Full name: Robert Tait Smith
- Born: 1907
- Died: 7 April 1958 (aged 50) Hawick, Scotland

Rugby union career
- Position: Prop
International career
| Years | Team | Apps | (Points) |
| 1929–30 | Scotland | 7 | (0) |

Robert Tait Smith (1907 — 1958) was a Scottish international rugby union player.

The son of a police inspector, Smith hailed from Kelso in the Scottish Borders.

Smith played for local side Kelso RFC and was a strongly-built forward, known by the nickname "Firpo" after the Argentine heavyweight boxer. He was capped seven times for Scotland, across the 1929 and 1930 Five Nations tournaments.

A baker by trade, Smith ran two businesses in the town of Hawick.

== See also ==
- List of Scotland national rugby union players
