= Geoffrey Gowlland =

- Full name: Geoffrey Cathcart Gowlland
- Born: 27 May 1885 Middlesex, England
- Died: 9 October 1980 (aged 95) Yeovil, Somerset, England
- School: Fettes College
- Occupation: Army officer

Rugby union career
- Position: Forward
International career
Years	Team	Apps	(Points)
1908–10	Scotland	7	(3)

Brigadier Geoffrey Cathcart Gowlland (27 May 1885 — 9 October 1980) was a British Army officer and Scotland international rugby union player.

Born in Middlesex, Gowlland was educated at Edinburgh's Fettes College. He played much of his rugby in the army and also competed with London Scottish. A forward, Gowlland gained seven caps for Scotland between 1908 and 1910.

Gowlland was deployed to France with the 2nd Infantry Division, BEF in World War I and was the only officer in his company to survive the First Battle of Ypres, but suffered severe injuries. He was awarded the Order of the Nile for later wartime service in Egypt, then rose up the ranks during the 1920s, at the end of which he was chief engineer in Iraq. Appointed a lieutenant-colonel in 1930, Gowlland was for a period the staff officer to the chief engineer at Aldershot. He served as chief engineer of the British Troops in China from 1937 until his retirement in 1940 and was granted honorary rank of brigadier.

== See also ==
- List of Scotland national rugby union players
