= David McFarlan =

Scotland international rugby union player

- Born: David James McFarlan; 3 October 1862 Meerut, India
- Died: 2 January 1940 (aged 77) London, England

Rugby union career
- Position: Centre
Amateur team(s)
Years	Team	Apps	(Points)
-	London Scottish		
International career
Years	Team	Apps	(Points)
1883-88	Scotland	8	(3 gls; 4 tries; 3 conv)

David McFarlan (3 October 1862 – 2 January 1940) was a Scotland international rugby union player.

== Rugby Union career ==
=== Amateur career ===
He went to Loretto School in Edinburgh.

Recruited by Bill Maclagan, he then played for London Scottish.

He played in a charity match for a combined London Scottish and London Welsh side against a combined London side in 1886.

=== International career ===
He was called up to the Scotland squad and played Wales at Raeburn Place, Edinburgh on 8 January 1883. It was the first of his 8 caps for Scotland.

== Death ==
The Surrey Advertiser of 6 January 1940 reported his death:

DEATH OF MR. D. J. McFARLAN
Former international footballer.
A former international footballer, who captained the Scottish side for five years, Mr. David James McFarlan, of Sandcroft, Pyrford Heath, Pyrford, died on Tuesday the age of 77. He was on the way to his office in London, and had just alighted from a bus when he had a heart attack. He collapsed and died almost immediately. He had a serious illness a year ago but made a good recovery. In his time Mr McFarlan was a promising ail-round athlete. He captained the Scottish football team in 1883, 1884, 1886, and 1889. He was also a good cricketer, and was formerly captain of the Madras Club. He was also a member of the M.C.C. Mr. McFarlan came to Pyrford from Sunninghill 20 years ago. He played cricket for the late Mr. Carlos Clarke’s team at Sunninghill; for the late Mr Stoop’s team at Old Byfleet; and for Pyrford. He could still be relied upon to make plenty of runs in his later years, and he did not give up game until he was sixty.
McFarlan was a partner in the firm Messrs. Leslie and Anderson, of Billiterstreet, London, East Indian merchants. He the son of Gen. David McFarlan. and was the head of the Clan McFarlan. He had a residence in Scotland at Nether Auchendrane, near Ayr. Mr. McFarlan leaves a widow. The funeral took place yesterday (Friday) at Golders Green.
