= Mike Walker (rugby union) =

Scotland international rugby union player

- Born: Michael Walker; 11 March 1930 London, England
- Died: 30 November 2014 (aged 84)
- School: Bryanston School

Rugby union career
- Position: Lock
Amateur team(s)
Years	Team	Apps	(Points)
- Oxford University
International career
Years	Team	Apps	(Points)
1952	Scotland	1	(0)

Mike Walker (11 March 1930 – 30 November 2014) was a Scotland international rugby union footballer, who played as a lock.

== Rugby union career ==
=== Amateur career ===
Walker played for Oxford University.

=== International career ===
He was capped for Scotland once in 1952, the cap coming in the Five Nations match against France.
