= Robert Whitworth (rugby union) =

Scotland international rugby union player

- Born: Robert John Eve Whitworth; 5 July 1914 New York, United States
- Died: 30 December 2002 (aged 88) Prestonpans, Scotland

Rugby union career
- Position: Wing
Amateur team(s)
Years	Team	Apps	(Points)
-	London Scottish.		
International career
Years	Team	Apps	(Points)
1936	Scotland	1	(0)

Robert Whitworth (5 July 1914 – 30 December 2002) was a Scotland international rugby union player. He played at the Wing position.

== Rugby Union career ==
=== Amateur career ===
Whitworth played for London Scottish.

=== International career ===
Whitworth was capped by Scotland for just one match. This was the Five Nations match against Ireland at Murrayfield Stadium on 22 February 1936. Ireland won the match 10 - 4.

Despite the defeat, Whitworth acquitted himself well in the match and was noted by The Glasgow Herald as having 'useful runs' throughout.
