= Ian Kilgour =

Scotland international rugby union player

- Born: Ian James Kilgour; 23 October 1900 Chichester, England
- Died: 20 April 1977 (aged 76) Bampton, Oxfordshire, England

Rugby union career
- Position: Wing
Amateur team(s)
Years	Team	Apps	(Points)
- London Scottish
–	Royal Military College		
Provincial / State sides
Years	Team	Apps	(Points)
1920	Anglo-Scots		
International career
Years	Team	Apps	(Points)
1921	Scotland	1	(0)

Ian Kilgour (23 October 1900 – 20 April 1977) was a Scotland international rugby union player.

== Rugby Union career ==
=== Amateur career ===
He played rugby union for London Scottish.

At the time of his only cap for Scotland he was noted as playing for Royal Military College, Sandhurst.

=== Provincial career ===
He played for Anglo-Scots in the 1920 match against Provinces District.

=== International career ===
He received 1 cap for Scotland in 1921.

== Family ==
He was born to Henry Kilgour (1847–1915) and Mary Smyth (1861–1945).

Kilgour married Aura Camilla Desmond Forestier-Walker on 25 October 1930.

Their daughter Joanna Camilla Kilgour (1931–2009) was born on 7 September 1931.
