= Erik Arne Melling =

Scotland international rugby union player

- Born: 25 September 1918 Wallsend, England
- Died: 24 February 2004 (aged 85) Newcastle upon Tyne, England

Rugby union career
- Position: Flanker
Amateur team(s)
Years	Team	Apps	(Points)
- Old Sedberghians
International career
Years	Team	Apps	(Points)
1945	Scotland	3	(0)

Erik Arne Melling (24 September 1918 - 24 February 2004) was a Scotland international rugby union player. He fought for Norway in the Second World War.

== Rugby Union career ==
=== Amateur career ===
He played for Old Sedberghians.

=== International career ===
Melling played in the 17 March 1945 Services International match against England for Scotland. As a Services international, Melling was finally given a retrospective cap in 2023.

In total, he received 3 caps, playing twice against England and once against Australia.

== Military career ==
He fought for Norway in the Second World War, and became a Lieutenant.

== Family ==
He married Margaret Rosemary Bell (20 August 1923 - 12 May 2016) in 1945. His father was E. J. Melling and Erik later ran his company.
