= Keith McMillan (rugby union) =

Scotland international rugby union player

- Born: Keith Henry Douglas McMillan; 13 February 1927 Durban, South Africa
- Died: 23 May 1998 (aged 71)
- Height: 1.80 m (5 ft 11 in)
- Weight: 92.5 kg (14 st 8 lb; 204 lb)
- School: Highbury Preparatory School; Hilton College
- University: Rhodes University; University of Cape Town

Rugby union career
- Position: Flanker
Amateur team(s)
Years	Team	Apps	(Points)
- University of Cape Town
–	Sale		
Provincial / State sides
Years	Team	Apps	(Points)
- Eastern Province
-	Western Province		
International career
Years	Team	Apps	(Points)
1953	Scotland	4	(0)

Keith McMillan (13 February 1927 – 23 May 1998) was a Scotland international rugby union footballer. McMillan played as a Flanker.

== Rugby union career ==
=== Amateur career ===
He played rugby for the University of Cape Town while in South Africa.

McMillan played for Sale.

=== Provincial career ===
McMillan represented Eastern Province and Western Province in South Africa.

=== International career ===
He was involved in a trial selection match for South Africa in 1951 but not selected further.

He was capped for Scotland 4 times in 1953.

== Outside of rugby ==
McMillan was an engineer.

A keen cricketer, he played for the combined South African Universities team.
