= Walter Kerr (rugby union) =

Scotland international rugby union player (1930–1976)

- Born: Walter Kerr; 14 September 1930
- Died: 10 May 1976 (aged 45) Surrey, England

Rugby union career
- Position: Flanker
Amateur team(s)
Years	Team	Apps	(Points)
- London Scottish
International career
Years	Team	Apps	(Points)
1953	Scotland	1	(0)

Walter Kerr (14 September 1930 – 10 May 1976) was a Scotland international rugby union player. He played as a Flanker. Kerr died in Surrey on 10 May 1976, aged 45.

== Rugby union career ==
=== Amateur career ===
Kerr played for London Scottish.

=== International career ===
Kerr was capped for Scotland once in 1953. He played in the Five Nations match against England at Twickenham Stadium on 21 March that year.
