= Ronald Warren =

Scotland international rugby union player

- Full name: Ronald Crawford Warren
- Born: 14 October 1900 Partick, Glasgow, Scotland
- Died: 1991 Glasgow, Scotland
- Occupation: Civil engineer

Rugby union career
- Position: Centre / Fullback
International career
Years	Team	Apps	(Points)
1922–30	Scotland	5	(0)

Ronald Crawford Warren (1900 – 1991) was a Scottish international rugby union player.

A Glasgow Academy product, Warren was the youngest of five brothers who played rugby for Glasgow Academicals, a team made up of past pupils. His eldest brother, Scotland centre Jack Warren, preceded him in the national side.

Warren was capped five times for Scotland from 1922 to 1930, initially as a centre and later fullback.

== See also ==
- List of Scotland national rugby union players
