= Edwin Henriksen =

Scotland international rugby union player

Edwin Hansen Henriksen
- Born: Edwin Hansen Henriksen; 14 May 1929 Glasgow, Scotland
- Died: 20 September 2000 (aged 71) Vancouver, Canada

Rugby union career
- Position: No. 8
Amateur team(s)
Years	Team	Apps	(Points)
- Royal HSFP
Provincial / State sides
Years	Team	Apps	(Points)
- Edinburgh District
International career
Years	Team	Apps	(Points)
1953	Scotland	1	(0)

Edwin Henriksen (14 May 1929 – 20 September 2000) was a Scottish international rugby union player. He played as a No. 8.

== Rugby union career ==
=== Amateur career ===
Henriksen played for Royal HSFP.
He also played Sevens for Royal HSFP in the 1950 Hawick Sevens tournament.

=== Provincial career ===
Henriksen played for a 'Rest of Edinburgh' side against Heriots FP on 19 April 1950. He was later selected for Edinburgh District to play in Inter-City match against Glasgow District in December 1950. In 1951 Edwin Henriksen played in a joint Glasgow-Edinburgh 'Cities XV' against South Africa. That same year he was selected for the Co-Optimists in 1951.

=== International career ===
He was involved in the trial match for Scotland selection on 17 December 1949 when the Kelvinside-West forward R.C. Taylor was injured. Henriksen played for the 'Rest of Scotland' side. In 1953 he was capped for Scotland once. Henriksen played in the Five Nations match against Ireland at Murrayfield Stadium on 28 February.

== Emigration ==
Shortly after playing for Scotland Henriksen emigrated to the United States of America on 27 May 1953.

He later moved to Canada in 1958.
