= William Murray (rugby union) =

Scotland international rugby union player

William Alexander Kininmonth Murray (17 April 1894 – ?) was a Scottish international rugby union player, who played for Scotland. He was capped three times between 1920 and 1921 at flanker.
