= Pat Burnet =

- Born: Patrick John Burnet; 25 July 1939 (age 87) Edinburgh, Scotland
- University: Lincoln College, Oxford

Rugby union career
- Position: Centre
Amateur team(s)
Years	Team	Apps	(Points)
- Edinburgh Academicals
- Oxford University
Provincial / State sides
Years	Team	Apps	(Points)
1961-	Edinburgh District		
1963	Blues Trial		
International career
Years	Team	Apps	(Points)
1960	Scotland	1	(0)

Pat Burnet (born 25 July 1939) is a former Scotland international rugby union player who played as a Centre.

== Rugby Union career ==
=== Amateur career ===
He played for Edinburgh Academicals.

He went to Lincoln College, Oxford, and then played rugby union for Oxford University.

=== Provincial career ===
Burnet was capped by Edinburgh District. His first Edinburgh cap came against Northumberland in 1961.

He played for Blues Trial against Whites Trial in December 1963.

=== International career ===
Burnet was capped by Scotland just the once, in 1960, to play against South Africa.
