= 2018 Melrose Sevens =

2018 Aberdeen Standard Investments Melrose Sevens
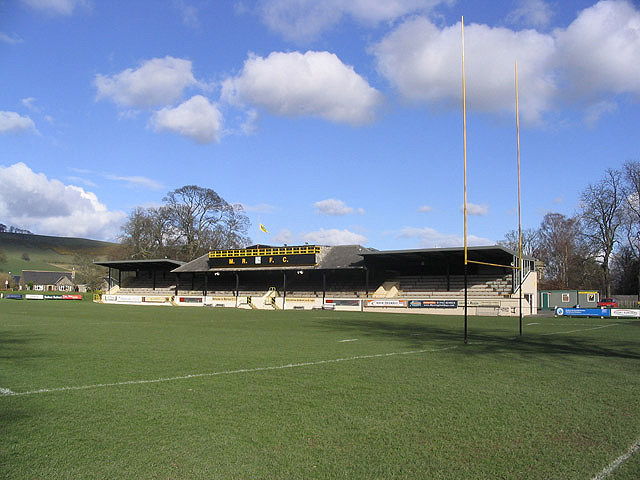
- The Greenyards in Melrose

Tournament details
- Countries: Scotland
- Tournament format(s): Knockout
- Date: 14 April 2018

Tournament statistics
- Teams: 24
- Matches played: 23

Final
- Venue: The Greenyards, Melrose
- Champions: (Scotland) Watsonian (9th title)
- Runners-up: (Scotland) Melrose

The 2018 Melrose Sevens also known as the Aberdeen Standard Investments Melrose Sevens was the 128th staging of the world's oldest annual Rugby sevens competition at the home of Melrose RFC at the Greenyards in Melrose, Scotland on Saturday 14 April 2018. It was played as a male only competition which featured 24 teams in a single elimination tournament with all the ties from the first round through to the final being played throughout the same day and formed part of the Kings of the Sevens series.

The later stages of the tournament was televised live for the last time on BBC Two Scotland and locally, from the first tie right through to the final, on Radio Borders.

The tournament was won by Scottish side Watsonian after they beat the home side Melrose 19-14 in a tightly fought final to win the Ladies Cup for the first time since 1996 and was Melrose's second consecutive loss in the final.

== Teams ==
The main tournament will consist of 21 teams from across Scotland as well as two specially invited overseas teams from the United States and Poland and the charity team Crusaders to make a combined total of 24 teams.

- (Scotland) Ayr
- (Scotland) Aberdeen
- (Scotland) Boroughmuir
- (Scotland) Cartha
- (Scotland) Currie
- (United Kingdom) Crusaders
- (Scotland) Dundee
- (Scotland) Edinburgh Uni
- (Scotland) Edinburgh Accies
- (Scotland) GHA
- (Scotland) Glasgow Hawks
- (Scotland) Gala
- (Scotland) Hawick
- (Scotland) Heriot's
- (Scotland) Jed-Forest
- (Scotland) Kelso
- (Scotland) Marr
- (Scotland) Melrose (host)
- (Scotland) Selkirk
- (Scotland) Stirling County
- (Scotland) Peebles
- Poland
- (United States) USA Tigers
- (Scotland) Watsonian

== Seedings ==
Sixteen unseeded Scottish sides will enter the competition in the first round whilst the seeded teams which includes the hosts Melrose, the four remaining Scottish teams Ayr, Jed-Forest, Edinburgh Accies and Watsonian the two invited overseas teams and the charity side Crusaders will enter the competition in the second round.

=== Unseeded teams which enter in the First round ===
- (Scotland) Aberdeen
- (Scotland) Boroughmuir
- (Scotland) Cartha
- (Scotland) Currie
- (Scotland) Dundee
- (Scotland) Edinburgh Uni
- (Scotland) GHA
- (Scotland) Glasgow Hawks
- (Scotland) Gala
- (Scotland) Hawick
- (Scotland) Heriot's
- (Scotland) Kelso
- (Scotland) Marr
- (Scotland) Selkirk
- (Scotland) Stirling County
- (Scotland) Peebles

=== Seeded teams which enter in the Second round ===
- (Scotland) Ayr
- (United Kingdom) Crusaders
- (Scotland) Edinburgh Accies
- (Scotland) Jed-Forest
- (Scotland) Melrose
- Poland
- (United States) USA Tigers
- (Scotland) Watsonian

== Tournament ==
The draw for the first and second rounds was made at the Greenyards in Melrose on Saturday 7 April 2018.

=== First round ===
14 April 2018

(Scotland) Currie	38 - 7	(Scotland) Glasgow Hawks

The Greenyards

14 April 2018

(Scotland) Cartha	17 - 28	(Scotland) Boroughmuir

The Greenyards

14 April 2018

(Scotland) Heriot's	7 - 21	(Scotland) Edinburgh Uni

The Greenyards

14 April 2018

(Scotland) Peebles	7 - 38	(Scotland) Dundee

The Greenyards

14 April 2018

(Scotland) Kelso	19 - 29	(Scotland) Marr

The Greenyards

14 April 2018

(Scotland) GHA	24 - 5	(Scotland) Gala

The Greenyards

14 April 2018

(Scotland) Hawick	24 - 12	(Scotland) Aberdeen

The Greenyards

14 April 2018

(Scotland) Selkirk	26 - 17	(Scotland) Stirling County

The Greenyards

=== Second round ===
14 April 2018

(Scotland) Currie	24 - 19	(Scotland) Jed-Forest

The Greenyards

14 April 2018

(Scotland) Boroughmuir	0 - 29	(Scotland) Melrose

The Greenyards

14 April 2018

(Scotland) Edinburgh Uni	19 - 21	(Scotland) Edinburgh Accies

The Greenyards

14 April 2018

(Scotland) Dundee	10 - 24	(United States) USA Tigers

The Greenyards

14 April 2018

(Scotland) Marr	33 - 7	Poland

The Greenyards

14 April 2018

(Scotland) GHA	31 - 5	(Scotland) Ayr

The Greenyards

14 April 2018

(Scotland) Hawick	12 - 31	(United Kingdom) Crusaders

The Greenyards

14 April 2018

(Scotland) Selkirk	19 - 24	(Scotland) Watsonian

The Greenyards

=== Quarter-finals ===
14 April 2018

(Scotland) Currie	5 - 29	(Scotland) Melrose

The Greenyards

14 April 2018

(Scotland) Edinburgh Accies	12 - 10	(United States) USA Tigers

The Greenyards

14 April 2018

(Scotland) Marr	21 - 20	(Scotland) GHA

The Greenyards

14 April 2018

(United Kingdom) Crusaders	5 - 21	(Scotland) Watsonian

The Greenyards

=== Semi-finals ===
14 April 2018

(Scotland) Melrose	27 - 0	(Scotland) Edinburgh Accies

The Greenyards

14 April 2018

(Scotland) Marr	14 - 19	(Scotland) Watsonian

The Greenyards

=== Final ===
14 April 2018
18:20 BST

(Scotland) Melrose	14 - 19	(Scotland) Watsonian

The Greenyards
Referee: C White

- This was the first Melrose Sevens final where the playing time was reduced from twenty to fourteen minutes in line with all other sevens matches.

== See also ==
- Melrose Sevens
- Rugby sevens
