= Christy Elliot =

Scotland international rugby union player (1933–2020)

- Born: Christopher Elliot; 24 February 1933 Langholm, Dumfries and Galloway, Scotland
- Died: 5 September 2020 (aged 87) Carlisle, England

Rugby union career
- Position: Wing
Amateur team(s)
Years	Team	Apps	(Points)
1947-72	Langholm		
–	Barbarians		
Provincial / State sides
Years	Team	Apps	(Points)
1962	South of Scotland District		
1965	Combined Scottish Districts		
International career
Years	Team	Apps	(Points)
1958-65	Scotland	12	(8)

Christy Elliot (24 February 1933 – 5 September 2020) was a Scotland international rugby union player.

== Rugby Union career ==
=== Amateur career ===
He played for Langholm. During his time at Langholm, the club won the Scottish Unofficial Championship in the 1958–59 season and the Border League in that same season, as well as the Langholm Sevens.

Elliot won a further 5 Sevens winners medals on the Border Sevens Circuit: winning Kelso Sevens once, Gala Sevens twice, Selkirk Sevens once and Earlston Sevens once.

He first played for Langholm as a 15-year-old in 1947, and last played for the club in 1972, 25 years later.

He also played for the Barbarians 3 times.

=== Provincial career ===
He played for South of Scotland District.

He captained the Combined Scottish Districts side in 1965, playing against South Africa. The Districts side won 16–8.

=== International career ===
He was capped for Scotland twelve times between 1958 and 1965.

== Military career ==
He did his national service in Korea with the King's Own Scottish Borderers.

== Business career ==
He became a tweed manager with Arthur Bell & Sons in Langholm.

== Family ==
His brother Tom Elliot was also capped for Scotland.
