= Jed-Forest Sevens =

Annual rugby sevens event

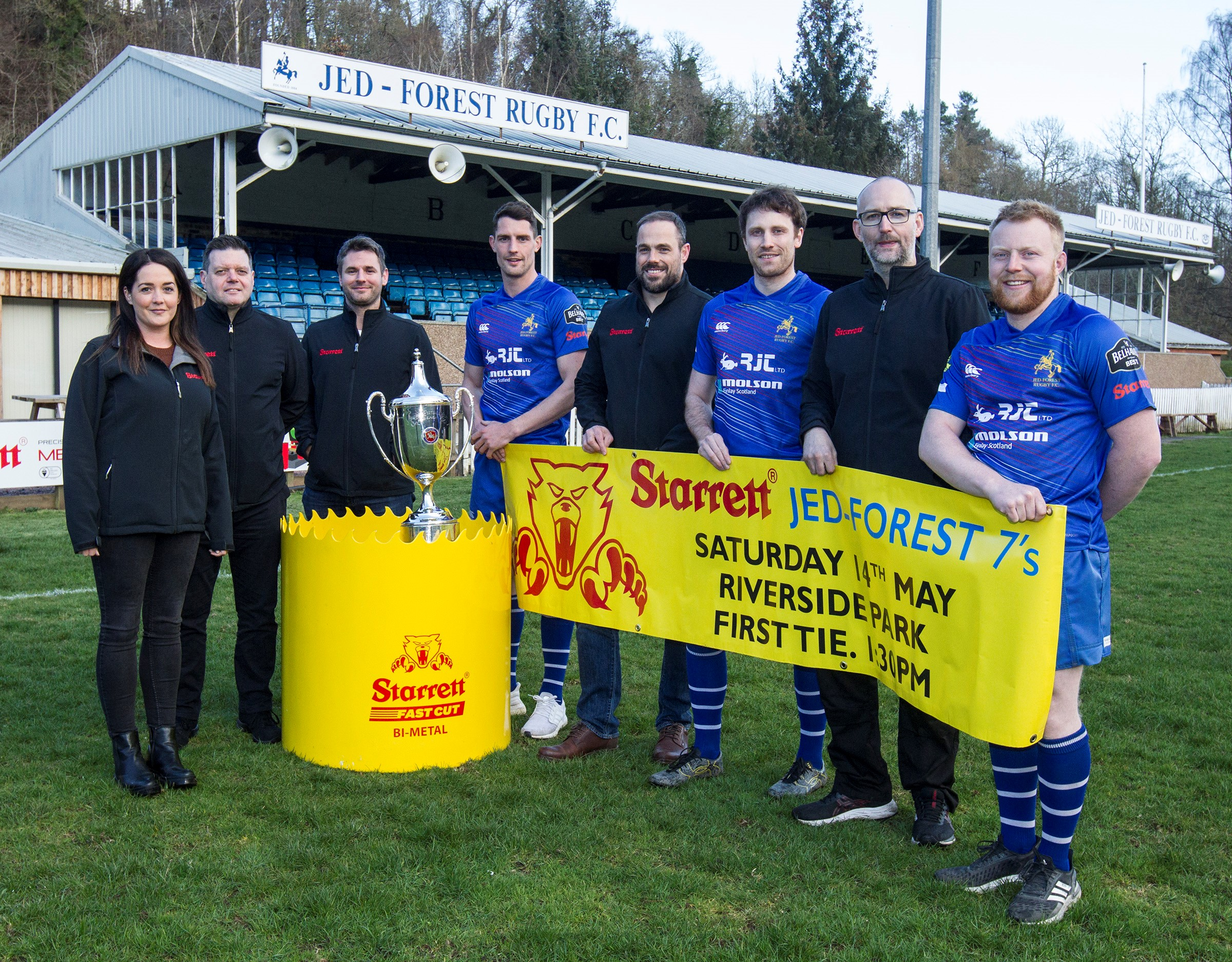
- Sport: Rugby sevens
- Instituted: 1894; 132 years ago
- Number of teams: 16
- Country: Scotland
- Holders: (Scotland) Melrose (2023)
- Most titles: (Scotland) Hawick (28 titles)
- Related competition: Kings of the Sevens

Jed-Forest Sevens is an annual rugby sevens event held by Jed-Forest RFC, in Jedburgh, Scotland. The Jed-Forest Sevens was the fourth of the Border Sevens tournaments to be instated, in 1894, after the Melrose Sevens (1883), Gala Sevens (1884) and the Hawick Sevens (1885).

The Jed-Forest Sevens are traditionally the last tournament of the Kings of the Sevens competition.

2024's Starrett's Jed-Forest Sevens will be played on 18th May.

== Sports day ==
Jed-Forest RFC] introduce a sports day in 1894 featuring rugby sevens as a way to supplement the club's income at the end of the season.

== Sponsorship ==
The Sevens tournament is now sponsored by Starrett UK. It was sponsored by RJT, Mainetti and Tennents before that.

== Past winners ==
- 2023 (Scotland) Melrose
- 2022 (Scotland) Jed-Forest
- 2021 no tournament - coronavirus pandemic
- 2020 no tournament - coronavirus pandemic
- 2019 (Scotland) Watsonians
- 2018 (Scotland) Melrose
- 2017 (Scotland) Watsonians
- 2016 (Scotland) Jed-Forest
- 2015 (Scotland) Jed-Forest
- 2014 (Scotland) Melrose
- 2013 (Scotland) Jed-Forest
- 2012 (Scotland) Heriots
- 2011 (Scotland) Melrose
- 2010 (Scotland) Melrose
- 2009 (Scotland) Hawick
- 2008 (Scotland) Watsonians
- 2007 (Scotland) Jed-Forest
- 2006 (Scotland) Heriots
- 2005 (Scotland) Melrose
- 2004 (Scotland) Watsonians
- 2003 (Scotland) Melrose
- 2002 (Scotland) Watsonians
- 2001 (Scotland) Jed-Forest
- 2000 (Scotland) Kelso
- 1999 (Scotland) Melrose
- 1998 (Scotland) Kelso
- 1997 (Scotland) Kelso
- 1996 (Scotland) Kelso
- 1995 (Scotland) Kelso
- 1994 (Scotland) Gala
- 1993 (Scotland) Gala
- 1992 (Scotland) Jed-Forest
- 1991 (Scotland) Hawick
- 1990 (Scotland) Kelso
- 1989 (Scotland) Selkirk
- 1988 (Scotland) Hawick
- 1987 (Scotland) Heriots
- 1986 (Scotland) Kelso
- 1985 (Scotland) Gala
- 1984 (Scotland) Kelso
- 1983 (Scotland) Kelso
- 1982 (Scotland) Kelso
- 1981 (Scotland) Hawick
- 1980 (Scotland) Stewart's Melville
- 1979 (Scotland) Kelso
- 1978 (Scotland) Kelso
- 1977 (Scotland) Hawick
- 1976 (Scotland) Hawick
- 1975 (Scotland) Jed-Forest
- 1974 (Scotland) Hawick
- 1973 (Scotland) Gala
- 1972 (Scotland) Hawick
- 1971 (Scotland) Gala
- 1970 (Scotland) Gala
- 1969 (Scotland) Gala
- 1968 (Scotland) Hawick
- 1967 (Scotland) Gala
- 1966 (Scotland) Hawick
- 1965 (Scotland) Gala
- 1964 (Scotland) Melrose
- 1963 (Scotland) Watsonians
- 1962 (Scotland) Hawick
- 1961 (Scotland) Hawick
- 1960 (Scotland) Stewart's College FP
- 1959 (Scotland) Stewart's College FP
- 1958 (Scotland) Heriots
- 1957 (Scotland) Hawick
- 1956 (Scotland) Watsonians
- 1955 (Scotland) Heriots
- 1954 (Scotland) Hawick
- 1953 (Scotland) Hawick
- 1952 (Scotland) Gala
- 1951 (Scotland) Gala
- 1950 (Scotland) Gala
- 1949 (Scotland) Hawick
- 1948 (Scotland) Stewart's College FP
- 1947 (Scotland) Royal HSFP
- 1946 (Scotland) Stewart's College FP
- 1942-1945 Second World War
- 1941 (Scotland) Edinburgh City Police
- 1940 (Scotland) Co-Optimists
- 1939 (Scotland) Heriots
- 1938 (Scotland) Heriots
- 1937 (Scotland) Hillhead HSFP
- 1936 (Scotland) Selkirk
- 1935 (Scotland) Selkirk
- 1934 (Scotland) Stewart's College FP
- 1933 (Scotland) Heriots
- 1932 (Scotland) Gala
- 1931 (Scotland) Hawick
- 1930 (Scotland) Gala
- 1929 (Scotland) Hawick
- 1928 (Scotland) Hawick
- 1927 (Scotland) Hawick
- 1926 (Scotland) Kelso
- 1925 (Scotland) Heriots
- 1924 (Scotland) Hawick
- 1923 (Scotland) Hawick
- 1922 (Scotland) Jed-Forest
- 1921 (Scotland) Gala
- 1920 (Scotland) Selkirk
- 1919 (Scotland) Hawick
- 1915-1918 First World War
- 1914 (Scotland) Kelso
- 1913 (Scotland) Kelso
- 1912 (Scotland) Hawick
- 1911 (Scotland) Edinburgh University
- 1910 (Scotland) Melrose
- 1909 (Scotland) Melrose
- 1908 (Scotland) Melrose
- 1907 (Scotland) Royal HSFP
- 1906 (Scotland) Watsonians
- 1905 (Scotland) Watsonians
- 1904 (Scotland) Jed-Forest 'A'
- 1903 (Scotland) Jed-Forest 'A'
- 1902 (Scotland) Jed-Forest 'A'
- 1901 (Scotland) Gala
- 1900 (Scotland) Jed-Forest 'A'
- 1899 (Scotland) Jed-Forest 'A'
- 1898 (Scotland) Hawick
- 1897 (Scotland) Hawick
- 1896 (Scotland) Hawick
- 1895 (Scotland) Hawick
- 1894 (Scotland) Hawick 'A'

'A' sides are shown where a club had entered two sides in the tournament

== See also ==
- Jed-Forest RFC
- Borders Sevens Circuit
- Scottish Rugby Union
