= Roger Baird =

British Lions & Scotland international rugby union player

- Born: Gavin Roger Todd Baird; 12 April 1960 (age 66) Kelso, Scotland

Rugby union career
- Position: Wing
Amateur team(s)
Years	Team	Apps	(Points)
- Kelso
Provincial / State sides
Years	Team	Apps	(Points)
- South of Scotland
International career
Years	Team	Apps	(Points)
1979-81	Scotland 'B'	4	
1981-88	Scotland	27	(0)
–	British and Irish Lions	4	(4)
Coaching career
- Years: Team
- Watsonians (Asst.)

Roger Baird (born 12 April 1960 in Kelso, Scotland) is a former Scotland international rugby union player.

== Rugby Union career ==
=== Amateur career ===
Baird attended St. Mary's School, Melrose and Merchiston Castle School in Edinburgh. Both schools are noted for producing strong rugby players, and he went on to play scrum-half for the Scottish Schools team.

He played for the full Kelso sevens team while still at Merchiston, collecting a Melrose winner's medal at 17. Bill McLaren considered him an exceptional sevens player.

=== Provincial career ===
Baird also played for the South of Scotland rugby union team. One odd feature of Baird's playing career was noted by Allan Massie:

"Extraordinarily he has not scored a try for Scotland, though he already holds the record number of tries for the South."

=== International career ===
Within two years he was capped by Scotland B winning his first 'B' cap on 1 December 1979 against Ireland 'B'; and he won the first of his full senior caps for Scotland in the 24–15 win over Australia at Murrayfield Stadium in 1981, replacing Bruce Hay. He won 27 caps in total playing on the wing for Scotland between 1981 and 1988.

A regular fixture on the left wing for Scotland, he went on the 1983 British Lions tour to New Zealand, playing in all four Tests, and scoring six tries in 11 appearances. In one of these tries in particularly wet weather, he slammed right into the billboards around the pitch.

Baird was very successful at District and Club level, and scored a number of times for the British Lions, including a test try against New Zealand in 1983, but never scored a try while representing Scotland.

=== Coaching career ===
He is a former team manager of Scotland U21s and is assistant coach to Kelso clubmate Gary Callander at Watsonians.

== Business career ==
Baird is a grain merchant.

== Controversies ==
Baird was invited as a guest speaker at the Glasgow University RFC 150th anniversary event held in Glasgow on 16 November 2019 where he made sexist remarks about some of the female rugby team players and racist remarks regarding a previous encounter with a person of Japanese origin.

Baird was heckled off the stage and the GURFC has since issued an apology for inviting him to speak, reiterating that they are a club which promotes inclusivity and diversity and that the remarks do not reflect the values or beliefs of the university or the Rugby Society.
