= John Goodfellow =

- Born: John Goodfellow; 24 August 1906 Langholm, Dumfries and Galloway, Scotland
- Died: April 2, 1951 (aged 44) Stranraer, Scotland

Rugby union career
- Position: Wing
Amateur team(s)
Years	Team	Apps	(Points)
1925-30	Langholm		
1930-32	Kelso		
1932-	Langholm		
Provincial / State sides
Years	Team	Apps	(Points)
1930	South		
International career
Years	Team	Apps	(Points)
1928	Scotland	3	(0)

John Goodfellow (24 August 1906 - 2 April 1951) was a Scotland international rugby union player.

== Rugby Union career ==
=== Amateur career ===
Goodfellow played for – and was internationally capped whilst at – Langholm.

About 1930 he moved to play for Kelso, but he moved back to play for Langholm in 1932.

=== Provincial career ===
He played for the South whilst with Kelso in 1930.

=== International career ===
He was capped for Scotland three times, all in 1928.

== Cricket career ==
Langholm Cricket Club held a contest between local teams for a silver cup in 1933, restricted to 25 overs. The teams in the final were the Artisans and Ford Mills. The Artisans won the cup by 2 runs. Their team included John Goodfellow. He won a special award for the highest individual score in the competition: 64.

== Banking career ==
He was manager of the Newton St. Boswells branch of the British Linen Bank, however in 1932 he got a move to the branch in his hometown of Langholm. It was noted that Goodfellow had been in poor health and it was hoped that a move to his hometown would bring about a change in his health.

He was manager of the Port William branch of the British Linen Bank at his death.
