= Hawick Linden Sevens =

Annual rugby sevens tournament

- Sport: Rugby sevens
- Instituted: 2012
- Number of teams: 8
- Country: Scotland
- Holders: (Scotland) Hawick Force (2019)

Hawick Linden Sevens is an annual rugby sevens event held by Hawick Linden RFC, in Hawick, Scotland. The first Hawick Linden Sevens tournament was held in 2012.

== History ==
The first tournament was staged on 14 April 2012. This was the same day as the prestigious Melrose Sevens tournament that was won by Saracens. The intention of the Hawick Linden Sevens tournament was to give teams not invited to the Melrose Sevens a chance to play in a Sevens tournament.

As league matches need to be rescheduled this has occasionally affected the staging of the Sevens tournament over the past years.

== Life Members Cup ==
The winner of the Hawick Sevens receives the Life Members Cup. The Player of the Tournament receives the Moira Black Trophy.

== Sponsorship ==
The Sevens tournament of 2019 was sponsored by Wilson Signs and Hunters the Bakers.

== Past winners ==
- 2019 (Scotland) Hawick Force
- 2018 No event
- 2017 (Scotland) Jed-Forest
- 2016 No event
- 2015 (Scotland) Hawick Linden
- 2014 (Scotland) St Boswells
- 2013 No event
- 2012 (England) Berwick

== See also ==
- Hawick Linden RFC
- Borders Sevens Circuit
- Scottish Rugby Union
