= Hawick Sevens =

Annual Scottish rugby sevens event

- Sport: Rugby sevens
- Instituted: 1886
- Number of teams: 16
- Country: Scotland
- Holders: (Scotland) Jed-Forest (2020)
- Most titles: (Scotland) Hawick (49 titles)
- Related competition: Kings of the Sevens

Hawick Sevens is an annual rugby sevens event held by Hawick RFC, in Hawick, Scotland. The Hawick Sevens tournament started in 1886 and is the third extant oldest Sevens tournament in the world; behind Melrose Sevens (1883) and Gala Sevens (1884).

Usually held around the end of every April, the tournament is part of the Kings of the Sevens competition. 2019's Hawick Sevens took place on the 20 April. The final was won by Boroughmuir.

For the 2019–20 season the tournament will instead move to an August fixture. This was played on 10 August 2019. No tournament was held for 2021 due to the coronavirus pandemic. The 2021–22 season event was won by Melrose.

The disassociated Hawick & Wilton Sevens started in 1885. These were run by Hawick and Wilton RFC - a cricket club that branched out to rugby union and was the progenitor of the Hawick RFC club - on separate dates from the Hawick Sevens tournament. Confusingly it shared similar winners to the Hawick Sevens before the rugby union arm shortly folded on the success of its progeny. Hawick & Wilton now remains as a cricket club.

== Sports Day ==
The Sevens tournament was initially billed as a Sports Day.

== Patterson Challenge Cup ==
The winner of the Hawick Sevens receives the Patterson Challenge Cup.

== Invited sides ==
Various sides have been invited to play in the Hawick Sevens tournament throughout the years. Saracens were invited in 1972 and Harlequins were invited in 1980. Bristol, the Welsh invitational side Crawshays RFC, Wakefield RFC and the Australian side Randwick DRUFC were invited in 1994.

Of the English sides so far invited:- Oxford University; London Scottish; London Welsh and Newcastle Falcons have all won the tournament.

== Past winners ==
- 2023 (Scotland) Hawick
- 2022 (Scotland) Melrose
- 2021 No event
- 2020 (Scotland) Jed-Forest
- 2019 (Scotland) Boroughmuir
- 2018 (Scotland) Watsonians
- 2017 (Scotland) Gala
- 2016 (Scotland) Hawick
- 2015 (Scotland) Hawick
- 2014 (Scotland) Melrose
- 2013 (Scotland) Hawick
- 2012 (Scotland) Hawick
- 2011 (Scotland) Hawick
- 2010 (Scotland) Hawick
- 2009 (Scotland) Hawick
- 2008 (Scotland) Hawick
- 2007 (England) Newcastle Falcons
- 2006 (England) Newcastle Falcons
- 2005 (England) Newcastle Falcons
- 2004 (Scotland) Watsonians
- 2003 (Scotland) Royal Scots
- 2002 (Scotland) Jed-Forest
- 2001 Foot & Mouth Disease
- 2000 (Scotland) Hawick
- 1999 (Scotland) Heriots
- 1998 (Scotland) Hawick
- 1997 (Scotland) Kelso
- 1996 (Scotland) Gala
- 1995 (Scotland) Gala
- 1994 (Scotland) Presidents VII
- 1993 No event
- 1992 (Scotland) Stewarts Melville
- 1991 (Scotland) Selkirk
- 1990 (Scotland) Jed-Forest
- 1989 (Scotland) Jed-Forest
- 1988 (Scotland) Hawick
- 1987 (Scotland) Boroughmuir
- 1986 (Scotland) Hawick
- 1985 (Scotland) Kelso
- 1984 (Scotland) Hawick
- 1983 (Scotland) Hawick
- 1982 (Scotland) Gala
- 1981 (Scotland) Kelso
- 1980 (Scotland) Stewarts Melville
- 1979 (Scotland) Hawick
- 1978 (Scotland) Boroughmuir
- 1977 (Scotland) Hawick
- 1976 (Scotland) Hawick
- 1975 (Scotland) Selkirk
- 1974 (Scotland) Melrose
- 1973 (Scotland) Kelso
- 1972 (Scotland) Gala
- 1971 (Scotland) Hawick
- 1970 (Scotland) Hawick
- 1969 (England) London Welsh
- 1968 (Scotland) Hawick
- 1967 (Scotland) Gala
- 1966 (Scotland) Hawick
- 1965 (England) London Scottish
- 1964 (Scotland) Hawick
- 1963 (Scotland) Hawick
- 1962 (Scotland) Royal HSFP
- 1961 (Scotland) Hawick
- 1960 (Scotland) Kelso
- 1959 (Scotland) Stewart's College FP
- 1958 (Scotland) Melrose
- 1957 (Scotland) Hawick
- 1956 (Scotland) Gala
- 1955 (Scotland) Hawick
- 1954 (Scotland) Heriots
- 1953 (Scotland) Hawick
- 1952 (Scotland) Stewart's College FP
- 1951 (Scotland) Hawick
- 1950 (Scotland) Watsonians
- 1949 (Scotland) Gala
- 1948 (Scotland) Hawick 'A'
- 1947 (Scotland) Heriots
- 1946 (Scotland) Edinburgh Accies*
- 1943-1945 Second World War
- 1942 (Scotland) Heriots
- 1941 (Scotland) Edinburgh City Police
- 1940 (Scotland) Gala
- 1939 (Scotland) Glasgow Academicals
- 1938 (Scotland) Royal HSFP
- 1937 (Scotland) Stewart's College FP
- 1936 (Scotland) Edinburgh Accies
- 1935 (Scotland) Heriots
- 1934 (Scotland) Hillhead HSFP
- 1933 (Scotland) Hawick
- 1932 (Scotland) Hawick
- 1931 (Scotland) Gala
- 1930 (Scotland) Hawick
- 1929 (Scotland) Edinburgh Accies
- 1928 (Scotland) Kelso
- 1927 (Scotland) Hawick
- 1926 (Scotland) Heriots
- 1925 (England) Oxford University
- 1924 (Scotland) Hawick
- 1923 (Scotland) Gala
- 1922 (Scotland) Heriots
- 1921 (Scotland) Hawick
- 1920 (Scotland) Jed-Forest
- 1919 (Scotland) Gala
- 1917-1918 First World War
- 1916 (Scotland) 3 & 4th K.O.S.Borderers
- 1915 First World War
- 1914 (Scotland) Royal HSFP
- 1913 (Scotland) J.H.D. Watsons
- 1912 (Scotland) Hawick
- 1911 (Scotland) Hawick
- 1910 (Scotland) Melrose
- 1909 (Scotland) Hawick
- 1908 (Scotland) Clydesdale
- 1907 (Scotland) Gala
- 1906 (Scotland) Watsonians
- 1905 (Scotland) Heriot's
- 1904 (Scotland) Hawick
- 1903 (Scotland) Hawick
- 1902 (Scotland) Hawick
- 1901 (Scotland) Gala
- 1900 (Scotland) Hawick
- 1899 (Scotland) Langholm
- 1898 (Scotland) Hawick
- 1897 (Scotland) Jed-Forest
- 1896 (Scotland) Jed-Forest
- 1895 (Scotland) Hawick
- 1894 (Scotland) Hawick
- 1893 (Scotland) Gala
- 1892 (Scotland) Hawick 'A'
- 1891 (Scotland) Gala
- 1890 No event
- 1889 (Scotland) Hawick and Wilton
- 1888 (Scotland) Hawick 'A'
- 1887 (Scotland) Hawick 'A'
- 1886 (Scotland) Hawick 'A'

Edinburgh Academicals and Edinburgh Wanderers jointly fielded the winning team in 1946*
'A' sides are shown where a club had entered two sides in the tournament

== Sponsorship ==
Hawick Sevens are sponsored by BSW Timber Group.

== See also ==
- Hawick RFC
- Borders Sevens Circuit
- Scottish Rugby Union
