= Hawick RFC =

Scottish rugby union team

(Scotland) Hawick
- Full name: Hawick Rugby Football Club
- Union: SRU
- Founded: 1885; 141 years ago
- Location: Hawick, Scotland
- Ground: Mansfield Park (Capacity: 5,000)
- President: Malcolm Grant
- Coach(es): Head Coach: Graham Hogg Assistant Coaches: Scott MacLeod, Allan Jacobsen Director Of Rugby: Gary Muir
- Captain: Shawn Muir
- League: Scottish Premiership
- 2025–26: Scottish Premiership, 7th of 10
Team kit

Official website
- hawickrfc.co.uk

Hawick Rugby Football Club is an semi-pro rugby union side, currently playing in the Scottish Premiership and Border League. The club was founded in 1885 and are based at Mansfield Park at Hawick in the Scottish Borders.

== Splinter from Hawick and Wilton RFC ==
The premier club of Hawick was Hawick and Wilton RFC. This was formed by the Hawick and Wilton Cricket Club members as a sport to play in the winter. It ran the Hawick and Wilton Sevens; the fourth oldest rugby sevens tournament in the world (behind Melrose [1883]; Gala [April 1884] and Selkirk Cricket Club [May 1884]). For the members of Hawick and Wilton RFC however cricket came first and this led to the splinter club of Hawick RFC forming in 1885. Hawick and Wilton RFC continued on after Hawick RFC formed as rivals; and for a time both the Hawick and Wilton Sevens and the later Hawick Sevens co-existed. Hawick and Wilton RFC eventually folded in 1890 as its members decided to purely focus on cricket.

== Establishment of the club ==
1885 saw some rugby players of Hawick and Wilton RFC found a new club to instead solely concentrate on rugby: the Hawick Football Club, moving to new premises at the Volunteer Park, just beyond the cricket pitch. New colours were adopted, dark green jerseys and stockings with white shorts, and in 1886 Hawick was admitted to membership of the Scottish Football (later Rugby) Union, only the 19th club to be admitted, the only earlier Border clubs being Gala and Melrose RFC.

In 1888 Hawick Football Club moved to its present home, Mansfield Park, at the other end of the town. The early seasons brought keenly contested games against Edinburgh Academicals, Gala, and Watsonians, and in 1896 Hawick won their first Scottish Unofficial Championship.

== 1945 to 1972 – Scottish domination ==
Between 1945 and 1972, Hawick club firmly established among the leaders of Scottish rugby, winning the unofficial championship eight times, taking the Border League title fifteen times, and earning fame as sevens specialists.

In the 1950s, all 15 of Hawick RFC were approached by rugby league scouts from Yorkshire.

In this period, Hugh McLeod, George Stevenson, Adam Robson, and Derrick Grant alone won 100 international caps between them, while fifteen other Greens played for their country.

== 1972 onwards ==
The official Scottish championship began in season 1973–74 and since that time Hawick has won the championship on twelve occasions. The club won the first Border League in 1901–02 and the first Scottish championship in 1973–74, and were also the first winners of the Scottish Cup in 1995–96. In season 2002–03, the Greens completed the treble, winning the Scottish League championship, Scottish Cup and Border League championship.

In 2009, the club was relegated to the second tier for the first time in their history. Hawick regained their place in the Premiership at the end of the 2012–13 season with a 39–38 playoff victory over Dundee HSFP.

== Hawick Force ==
The club run a 2nd XV called Hawick Force, who play in the new Border Junior League.

Forwards Coaches: Matthew Landels,

Backs Coach:

Team Manager: Kenny "Shovie" Colville

== Honours ==
- Scottish Unofficial Championship
  - Champions (10 + 4 shared): 1895–96, 1899-1900 (with Edinburgh Academicals and Edinburgh University), 1908-09 (with Watsonians), 1926–27, 1932-33 (with Dunfermline), 1948–49, 1954–55, 1959–60, 1960–61, 1963–64, 1964-65 (with West of Scotland), 1965–66, 1967–68, 1971–72
- Scottish Premiership
  - Champions (13): 1973–74, 1974–75, 1975–76, 1976–77, 1977–78, 1981–82, 1983–84, 1984–85, 1985–86, 1986–87, 2000–01, 2001–02, 2022–2023
- Scottish League Championship, second tier
  - Runners-Up (1): 2012–13
- Scottish Cup
  - Champions (4): 1995–96, 2001–02, 2022-23, 2023-24
  - Runners-Up (1): 2014–15
- Langholm Sevens
  - Champions (29): 1909, 1911, 1912, 1913, 1914, 1922, 1923, 1927, 1932, 1946, 1955, 1956, 1958, 1961, 1962, 1966, 1973, 1976, 1977, 1980, 1982, 1984, 1985, 1991, 2000, 2004, 2009, 2012, 2015
- Melrose Sevens
  - Champions (28): 1887, 1892, 1893, 1894, 1895, 1896, 1897, 1898, 1900, 1901,1908, 1909, 1910, 1911, 1912, 1913, 1919, 1922, 1924, 1925, 1927, 1929, 1933, 1946, 1953, 1955, 1966, 1967
- Hawick Sevens
  - Champions (49): 1886, 1887, 1888, 1892, 1894, 1895, 1898, 1900, 1902, 1903, 1904, 1909, 1911, 1912, 1921, 1924, 1927, 1930, 1932, 1933, 1948, 1951, 1953, 1955, 1957,1961, 1963, 1964, 1966, 1968, 1970, 1971, 1976, 1977, 1979, 1983, 1984, 1986, 1988, 1998, 2000, 2008, 2009, 2010, 2011, 2012, 2013, 2015, 2016
  - Hawick hold the record for most consecutive victories (6): 2008, 2009, 2010, 2011, 2012, 2013
- Gala Sevens
  - Champions (42): 1893, 1894, 1895, 1896, 1897, 1898, 1900, 1901, 1902, 1903, 1904, 1906, 1909, 1910, 1911, 1912, 1923, 1924, 1926, 1927, 1928, 1931, 1932, 1933, 1935, 1940, 1946, 1947, 1949, 1956, 1958, 1959, 1960, 1961, 1966, 1967, 1968, 1978, 1979, 1986, 1992, 2007
  - Hawick hold the record for most consecutive victories (6): 1893, 1894, 1895, 1896, 1897, 1898
- Jed-Forest Sevens
  - Champions (28): 1894, 1895, 1896, 1897, 1898, 1912, 1919, 1923, 1924, 1927, 1928, 1929, 1931, 1949, 1953, 1954, 1957, 1960, 1961, 1966, 1968, 1972, 1976, 1977, 1981, 1988, 1991, 2009
- Peebles Sevens
  - Champions (1): 1926
- Kelso Sevens
  - Champions (15): 1923, 1925, 1929, 1935, 1945, 1951, 1958, 1959, 1960, 1962, 1963, 1965, 1966, 1967, 1968
- Earlston Sevens
  - Champions (12): 1925, 1926, 1946, 1948, 1956, 1961, 1962, 1963, 1966, 1967, 1969, 1970
- Selkirk Sevens
  - Champions (15): 1919, 1924, 1927, 1930, 1933, 1939, 1953, 1954, 1957, 1959, 1966, 1967, 1969, 1981, 1986
- Walkerburn Sevens
  - Champions (3): 1998, 2000, 2007
- Hawick Linden Sevens
  - Champions (1): 2019 (won by Hawick Force)
- Hawick and Wilton Sevens
  - Champions (3): 1886, 1887, 1888

== Notable players ==
Hawick RFC have already seen 58 players represent Scotland.

- Adam Robson (22)
- Alan Tomes (48)
- Alex Fiddes
- Alex Laidlaw (1)
- Alister Campbell (15)
- Andrew Broatch
- Anthony Little
- Brian Hegarty
- Cameron Murray (26)
- Colin Deans (52)
- Colin Telfer (17)
- Darcy Graham
- Dave Callam
- Dave Valentine
- Derek Turnbull (15)
- Derrick Grant (14)
- Derrick Patterson
- Doug Davies
- Douglas Jackson
- Drew Turnbull
- Eric Milligan
- George Stevenson (24)
- Gregor Hunter
- Hugh McLeod (40)
- Ivan Laing
- James Gowans
- Jerry Foster
- Jim Renwick (52)
- Jock Beattie (23)
- John Anderson
- John Hegarty
- John Houston
- Lana Skeldon
- Lisa Thomson
- Nikki Walker (24)
- Norman Pender
- Oliver Grant
- Robert Scott
- Rob Valentine
- Rob Welsh (2)
- Rory Sutherland
- Scott Forrest
- Scott MacLeod (23)
- Stuart Hogg (100)
- Thomas Wright
- Tom Scott
- Tom Scott
- Tony Stanger (52)
- Walter Sutherland,(13) "Wattie Suddie"
- Willie Kyle (21)
- Willie Welsh (21)

== 1888 British Isles tourists ==
Three Hawick players took part in the 1888 British Lions tour to New Zealand and Australia

- Bob Burnet Forward
- Willie Burnet Half-back
- Alex Laing Forward

=== Other famous players ===
The famous rugby commentator Bill McLaren also played for Hawick.

== See also ==
- Border League
- Borders Sevens Circuit
- Hawick Harlequins RFC

== Bibliography ==
- Bath, Richard, ed. (1997). Complete Book of Rugby. Seven Oaks Ltd. ISBN 1-86200-013-1.
- Bath, Richard (ed.) The Scotland Rugby Miscellany (Vision Sports Publishing Ltd, 2007 ISBN 1-905326-24-6)
- Godwin, Terry Complete Who's Who of International Rugby (Cassell, 1987, ISBN 0-7137-1838-2)
- Jones, J.R. Encyclopedia of Rugby Union Football (Robert Hale, London, 1976 ISBN 0-7091-5394-5)
- Massie, Allan A Portrait of Scottish Rugby (Polygon, Edinburgh; ISBN 0-904919-84-6)
