= Hawick Linden RFC =

Scottish rugby union club, based in Hawick

(Scotland) Hawick Linden RFC
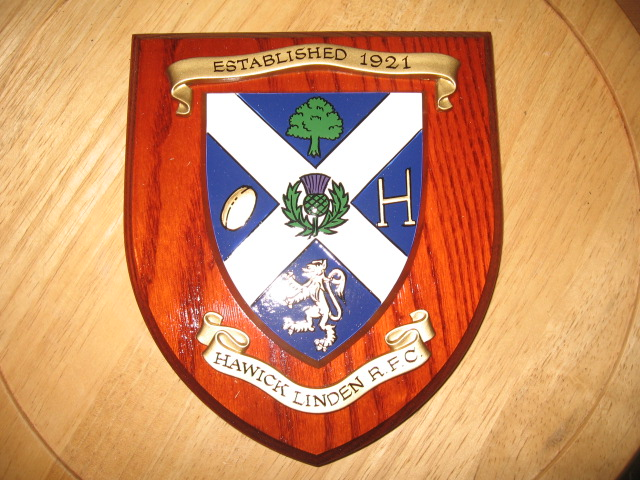
- Full name: Hawick Linden Rugby Football Club
- Union: Scottish Rugby Union
- Founded: 1921; 105 years ago
- Location: Hawick, Scotland
- Ground: Volunteer Park
- League: East Division Two
- 2025–26: East Division Three, 1st of 7 (promoted)
Team kit

Official website
- www.freewebs.com/hawicklinden

Hawick Linden RFC are a rugby union team based in Hawick, in the Scottish Borders. They compete in the East Regional Leagues.

For season 2026/27 they in the East Division Two.

Honours:

Season 2025/26- Jonny Mitchell Trophy, Hawick Linden 7s Cup Winners, East League 3 Winners- Undefeated, East Bowl Winners, National Shield Runners Up.

Season 2024/25- Hawick Linden 7s Shield Winners, Majorca Beach Rugby Shield Winners. 2nd- East League 3

Season 2021/22- Carrickfergus 7s Shield Winners

Season 2018/19- East League 2 Winners- Undefeated.

Season 2014/15- Hawick Linden 7s Winners

Season 2008/09- in which they were undefeated, they won all 12 games, they made it to the semi-final of the Scottish Plate. They play their home games at Volunteer Park.

== Hawick Linden Sevens ==
The club organise the annual Hawick Linden Sevens tournament in April every year.

== Club internationalists ==
- Jock Beattie 23 caps
- Adam Robson 22 caps
- George Stevenson 24 caps
- Rob Welsh 2 caps
- Ian Barnes 7 caps
- Alister Campbell 15 caps
- Tony Stanger 52 caps
- Rob Barrie 1 cap
- Billy Hunter 7 caps
- Derek Deans 1 cap
- Graham Hogg 2 caps
- Jim Hay 1 cap
- Nikki Walker

== Sevens- Honours ==
- Hawick Linden Sevens
  - Champions (1): 2015, 2025
- Majorca Beach Sevens- Shield Winners- 2025
- Carrickfergus Sevens- Shield Winners 2022
- Selkirk Junior Sevens
  - Champions (1): 1993, 1996
- Langholm Junior Sevens
  - Champions (1): 1927, 1952, 1960, 1969, 1981
- Dumfries Sevens
  - Champions (1): 1960, 1965, 1966, 1967, 1968, 1969, 1976, 1995
- South of Scotland District Sevens
  - Champions (1): 1966, 1969, 1978, 1983, 1996
- North Berwick Sevens
  - Champions (1): 1975, 1983

== Current squad ==
Hawick Linden Rugby Football squad
Props: (Scotland) Jordan White; (Scotland) Michael Boyle; (Scotland) Aiden Cannon; (Scotland) Aiden Fairbairn; (Scotland) Ross Borthwick; (Scotland) Keith Mabon; Hookers: (Scotland) Rhys Thomas; Locks: (Scotland) Jack Wilson; (Scotland) James Rowley; (Scotland) Damian Wargacki; Damian Wargacki; Dominik Kubicki; Ryan Muir; Leroi Kelly	Back row: (Scotland) Graham Colville; (Scotland) Matthew Huggan; (Scotland) James Rowley; (Scotland) Kieran Scott; (Scotland) Liam Sharkey; Scrum-halves: (Scotland) Euan Wood; (Scotland) Rory Graham; (Scotland) Alexander Beveridge; Fly-halves: (Scotland) Chris Shand; (Scotland) Kris Rowley	Centres: (Scotland) Connor Gracie; (Scotland) Matthew Mallin; (Scotland) Graeme Anderson; Wings: (Scotland) Lewis Stormont; (Northern Ireland) Michael Brownrigg; (Scotland) Scott Gendinning; Fullbacks: (Scotland) Craig Glendinning; (Scotland) John Frew
