= Oliver Turnbull =

Scotland international rugby union player

- Born: Francis Oliver Turnbull; 3 June 1919 Melrose, Scotland
- Died: 19 February 2009 (aged 89) St Boswells, Scotland

Rugby union career
- Position: Centre
Amateur team(s)
Years	Team	Apps	(Points)
- Kelso
–	Barbarians		
Provincial / State sides
Years	Team	Apps	(Points)
- South
-	Co-Optimists		
International career
Years	Team	Apps	(Points)
1951	Scotland	2	(0)

Oliver Turnbull (3 June 1919 – 19 February 2009) was a Scotland international rugby union footballer, who played as a centre.

== Rugby career ==
=== Amateur career ===
Turnbull played for Kelso. He captained the side; and Kelso shared the 'unofficial' Scottish championship title with Aberdeen GSFP in the 1947–48 season.

He retired from rugby union in 1952.

=== Provincial career ===
Turnbull played for South for over a decade.

He also captained the Co-Optimists.

=== International career ===
He was capped for Scotland twice in 1951, playing in one Five Nations match of that year, against France; and then he was capped playing against South Africa.

He was a late debutant for Scotland, wearing the dark blue shirt for the first time at the age of 32.

Turnbull played for the Barbarians three times in 1951.

== Outside of rugby ==
Turnbull had a year with the King's Own Scottish Borderers.

He worked in forestry and farming. His father owned a sawmill business in Kelso. Turnbull had his farm at Hiltonshill Farm, St. Boswells.
