= Gary Callander =

Scotland international rugby union player (1959–2021)

- Born: Gary James Callander; 5 July 1959 Kelso, Scotland
- Died: 5 December 2021 (aged 62) Melrose, Scotland

Rugby union career
- Position: Hooker
Amateur team(s)
Years	Team	Apps	(Points)
- Kelso
1980	Co-Optimists		
1982	Scottish Borderers		
Provincial / State sides
Years	Team	Apps	(Points)
- South of Scotland
1986	Combined Scottish Districts		
International career
Years	Team	Apps	(Points)
1982	Scotland 'B'	1	
1984–1988	Scotland	6	(0)
Coaching career
- Years: Team
- 1990: Haddington
- Gala
- 2001–2004: Watsonians
- Kelso

Gary Callander (5 July 1959 – 5 December 2021) was a Scottish international rugby union player who made six international appearances for the Scotland national team between 1984 and 1988. He played in the Hooker position. He coached Haddington, Gala, Watsonians and Kelso.

== Rugby Union career ==
=== Amateur career ===
Callander began his rugby career playing for Kelso at the age of 16; and at the age of 18 collected his first coveted Melrose Sevens winner's medals.

While captain of Kelso Rugby Club (1984–85 and 1987–88) he led the team to become Border League winners in 1984–85 and to then win the Division 1 Championships in 1987–88.

He won the Melrose Sevens five times in total.

His Sevens career also took him twice to the final of the Hong Kong Sevens Cup competition, playing for the Co-Optimists and the Scottish Borderers.

=== Provincial career ===
Callander played for South of Scotland District. He was part of the squad that won the Scottish Inter-District Championship in 1984–85 season.

He played for Combined Scottish Districts on 1 March 1986 against South of Scotland and captained the side.

=== International career ===
Callander was capped by Scotland 'B' in 1982 to play against France 'B'.

He won six caps playing hooker for the Scotland national team between 1984 and 1988. He was captain of the Scottish team for five matches, including a 24–11 win over France at Murrayfield Stadium in 1988.

In 1985 a knee injury led to him missing the 1985 Scotland rugby union tour of North America. In 1986 he captained Scotland for a tour of France and Spain during which Scotland won two out of five matches and drew one.

=== Coaching career ===
Callander coached at Haddington from 1990.

In 1993, together with Simon Scott, he began coaching the Scottish students team.

He has successfully coached a wide range of teams across Scotland between 1991 and 2007 including Gala, Watsonians and Kelso. He joined Watsonians in 2001 and left in 2004.

He later offered help to Merchiston Castle School in Edinburgh.

== Personal life ==
Callander died from pancreatic cancer in Melrose, on 5 December 2021, at the age of 62.
