= John Hastie (rugby union) =

Scotland international rugby union player

- Born: John Dickson Hart Hastie; 16 March 1908 Peebles, Scotland
- Died: 19 January 1965 (aged 56) Peebles, Scotland

Rugby union career
- Position: Hooker
Amateur team(s)
Years	Team	Apps	(Points)
- Melrose
–	Co-Optimists		
–	Army		
Provincial / State sides
Years	Team	Apps	(Points)
1938	Scotland Possibles		
1939	South of Scotland District		
International career
Years	Team	Apps	(Points)
1938	Scotland	3	(0)

John Hastie (16 March 1908 – 19 January 1965) was a Scotland international rugby union player. He played as a Hooker.

== Rugby union career ==
=== Amateur career ===
Hastie played for Melrose.

He was the third Melrose player to be capped for Scotland; after J.R. Lawrie and J. W. Allan.

He played for the Co-Optimists in March 1939 against Cambridge University Vandals. Unfortunately he was injured in the match, and went off with an injured knee.

He also played for the Army.

=== Provincial career ===
Hastie was a substitute used in the Scotland Probables side for the second and final trial match of that season, on 15 January 1938

He played for South of Scotland District in 1939.

=== International career ===
Hastie was capped by Scotland 3 times, all in 1938.

He was later capped for Scotland in a military services team to played England Services.

=== Administrative career ===
In 1950 and 1951, he was the Vice-President of Melrose RFC.

He became President of Melrose RFC in 1952.

He was also a selector for South of Scotland District.
