= Ned Haig =

Scottish rugby union player

- Born: Edward Haig; 7 December 1858 Jedburgh, Scottish Borders, Scotland
- Died: 29 March 1939 (aged 80) Melrose, Scottish Borders, Scotland

Rugby union career
Amateur team(s)
Years	Team	Apps	(Points)
1880-	Melrose RFC		
Provincial / State sides
Years	Team	Apps	(Points)
- South of Scotland

Ned Haig (7 December 1858 in Jedburgh, Scotland – 29 March 1939 in Melrose, Scotland, buried in Wairds Cemetery, Melrose, Scotland) was a butcher and rugby union player notable for founding the sport of rugby sevens. He moved to Melrose when he was young. There he took up rugby (now rugby union) and joined Melrose Rugby Football Club (RFC) in 1880. In 1883 Haig suggested hosting a sports tournament to help raise money for the Melrose RFC and came up with the idea of playing with seven rather than 15 a side and reducing the match length to 15 minutes (from 80 minutes).

== Early life ==
Haig was born in Jedburgh, moving to Melrose when young. He was employed at a butcher's shop. After participating in the traditional annual Fastern's E'en Ba game, he became interested in the similar game of rugby union, joining the local Melrose RFC side in 1880, initially playing for the seconds before making the first team and also playing for South of Scotland.

== Origin of rugby sevens ==
In 1883, with the club short of funds, Haig suggested hosting a tournament as part of a sports day to raise money. As it would not be possible to play several rugby games in one afternoon with a full squad of 15, teams for the tournament were reduced to seven men, with the match time reduced to 15 minutes.

The inaugural Melrose Sports took place on 28 April 1883, and included foot races, drop-kicks, dribbling races and place kicking as well as the main attraction of the rugby tournament, which attracted eight teams. Haig played on the Melrose team, which defeated local rivals Gala in the final, receiving a cup donated by the ladies of Melrose (now known as The Ladies Cup). The immediate success of the tournament meant that other clubs in the Borders region also set up their own rugby sevens competitions.

After Haig retired from competition, he continued to take an active part in the running of the club, serving for several seasons on the General and Match committee. He died in Melrose on 29 March 1939.

In 2008, Haig and Melrose RFC were honoured for their role in the creation of rugby sevens with induction to the IRB Hall of Fame.

== Gravestone ==
The following inscription can be found on Haig's gravestone in Melrose:

Edward 'Ned' Haig Born Jedburgh 7th December, 1858 Died Melrose 29th March 1939 Erected by the Border Rugby Clubs in memory of the originator of seven-a-side Rugby.

== See also ==
- Melrose Sevens
- Melrose Rugby Club
- Rugby World Cup Sevens, whose trophy is known as the Melrose Cup
- World Rugby Sevens Series

== Notes and references ==
- Jones, J.R. Encyclopedia of Rugby Union Football (Robert Hale, London, 1976 ISBN 0-7091-5394-5)
