= Jim Inglis =

Scotland international rugby union player & footballer

- Born: James Messer Inglis; 20 March 1928 Selkirk, Scotland
- Died: 20 November 2015 (aged 87) Selkirk, Scotland

Rugby union career
- Position: Prop
Amateur team(s)
Years	Team	Apps	(Points)
1945-57	Selkirk		
–	King's Own Scottish Borderers		
Provincial / State sides
Years	Team	Apps	(Points)
- South
-	Co-Optimists		
-	Scottish Borders		
International career
Years	Team	Apps	(Points)
1952	Scotland	1	(0)

Jim Inglis (20 March 1928 – 20 November 2015) was a Scotland international rugby union footballer, who played as a Prop.

== Rugby union career ==
=== Amateur career ===
Inglis played for Selkirk.

Inglis won the unofficial Scottish championship with Selkirk in the 1952-53 season as well as winning the Border League.

During his time with the KOSB he played for their rugby side.

=== Provincial career ===
Inglis represented South. He played in the Scottish Inter-District Championship in its first season; 1953-54.

Inglis was also selected for the Co-Optimists and the Scottish Borderers.

=== International career ===
Inglis was capped for Scotland once, in 1952, in the Five Nations Calcutta Cup match against England.

=== Administration ===
Inglis became President of Selkirk rugby club and the Border League.

Inglis received the Spirit of Rugby award in 2015, shortly before his death.

== Outside of rugby ==
Inglis served in the King's Own Scottish Borderers.

For a short period he became a goalkeeper for Selkirk F.C.
