= Stewart's Melville RFC =

Scottish rugby union club, based in Edinburgh

(Scotland) Stewart's Melville
- Full name: Stewart's Melville Rugby Football Club
- Union: Scottish Rugby Union
- Founded: 1973; 53 years ago
- Location: Edinburgh, Scotland
- Ground: Inverleith
- Chairman: David Lister
- President: Jason Conlin
- Coach: Andrew Kelly
- Captain: Jamie Sword
- League: Scottish National League Division Two
- 2024–25: Scottish National League Division Two, 2nd of 9
| Team kit | 2nd kit |

Official website
- www.stewmelrugby.com

Stewart's Melville RFC is a rugby union club based in Edinburgh, Scotland. The team competes in Scottish National League Division Two, the third tier of Scottish club rugby. Home matches are played at Inverleith; this was the venue for Scotland's home games between 1899 and 1925, during which time the first matches against France and New Zealand were played.

== History ==
The club took on its present form following the merger of Stewart's College FP and Melville College FP in 1973 when the club became known as Stewart's Melville FP RFC.

As the name suggests, many of the players in the club's history were former pupils of the Stewart's Melville College (formed in a merger of Daniel Stewart's College and Melville College) in Edinburgh. This remains the case today, although the club is now 'open' and welcomes players who did not attend the school.

The 1st XV were coached by Grant MacKenzie, a P.E. teacher who worked at the school, and who died in 2008.

In June 2014 the club resolved at an AGM to shorten the name to Stewart's Melville RFC.

The club currently run two XVs on a regular basis. The 1st and 2nd XVs both play in competitive leagues with the 2nd XV currently playing in Arnold Clark Inter City Reserve League Division 2.

== Club Honours ==
- Melrose Sevens
  - Champions (1): 1979
- Langholm Sevens
  - Champions (2): 1979, 1983
- Hawick Sevens
  - Champions (2): 1980, 1992
- Gala Sevens
  - Champions (2): 1976, 1980
- Kelso Sevens
  - Champions (1): 1978, 1979
- Jed-Forest Sevens
  - Champions (1): 1980
- Selkirk Sevens
  - Champions (2): 1976, 1977
- Middlesex Sevens
  - Champions (1): 1982
- Edinburgh Northern Sevens
  - Champions (1): 2003, 2006

== Recent Internationals ==
- Richie Vernon
- Ross Rennie
- Graham Shiel
- Graeme Burns
- Dougie Morgan
- Alex Brewster
- Jim Calder
- Finlay Calder
- Douglas Wyllie
- Ian Forsyth
- A.J.W. Hinshelwood
- Scott Riddell
- George Turner
- Ryan Grant
- Douglas Wyllie
