= Selkirk RFC =

Scottish rugby union club, based in Selkirk

(Scotland) Selkirk
- Full name: Selkirk Rugby Football Club
- Union: Scottish Rugby Union
- Founded: 1907; 119 years ago
- Ground: Philiphaugh (Capacity: 6,000)
- President: David Anderson
- Coach(es): Scott Wight (Head Coach); Michael Jaffray; Darren Hoggan; Tam Ramage (Manager); Neil Darling (A team); Darren Clapperton (A team); Bryan Hoggan Manager (A team)
- Captain: Ewan McDougall (Vice Captain)
- League: Scottish Premiership
- 2024–25: Scottish Premiership, 5th of 12
Team kit

Official website
- selkirkrfc.com

Selkirk Rugby Football Club are a rugby union side based in Selkirk in the Borders, Scotland.

They play in their home games at Philiphaugh, and compete in the Scottish Premiership (the highest tier of club rugby) and the Border League (the oldest established rugby union league in the world).

The club was officially instituted in 1907, but the game of rugby was played in the Royal and Ancient Burgh of Selkirk long before this date. In 1877 a game described as the first to be played under rules took place at Philiphaugh. Indeed, Selkirk sent a team to the inaugural Melrose Sevens tournament back in 1883, and have been trying to win the Tournament ever since.

The club has produced twelve Scotland internationalists and several British Lions, including John Rutherford, and Ian Paxton.

Selkirk's youth system is set up through Schools rugby at Selkirk High School up until the 3rd year. Through the fourth, fifth, and sixth years, players who wish to continue playing rugby join Selkirk Youth Club. Selkirk Youth Club has had much recent success, being unbeaten league Champions in 2010 and winning the league again in 2012 with one defeat, Border Cup winners in 2011 and National U18 Cup finalists in 2011 and 2012. They also won the National U18 Cup in 2003.

== Selkirk Sevens ==
Selkirk RFC run the Selkirk Sevens. Selkirk's own Sevens tournament takes place annually in May. First competed in 1919, this now makes up part of the Kings of the Sevens competition. Current holders of the trophy are Selkirk themselves.

== Honours ==
- Scottish Championship:
  - Champions (1): 1953
- Border League
  - Champions (6): 1935, 1938, 1953, 2008, 2009, 2010
  - Runners Up (2): 2007, 2011
- Langholm Sevens
  - Champions (3): 1921, 2013, 2017
- Kelso Sevens
  - Champions (3): 1984, 2005, 2007
- Hawick Sevens
  - Champions (2): 1975, 1991
- Gala Sevens
  - Champions (1): 2009
- Berwick Sevens
  - Champions (1): 2010
- Jed-Forest Sevens
  - Champions (4): 1920, 1935, 1936, 1989
- Peebles Sevens
  - Champions (4): 1927, 1929, 1933, 2016
- Earlston Sevens
  - Champions (9): 1929, 1931, 1932, 1933, 1975, 1976, 1980, 2007, 2022
- Selkirk Sevens
  - Champions (14): 1920, 1922, 1923, 1960, 1982, 1988, 1989, 1994, 2007, 2008, 2009, 2011, 2013, 2018
  - Selkirk hold the record for most consecutive victories (4): 2007, 2008, 2009, 2011 - no Sevens held in 2010
- Kings of the Sevens:
  - Champions (2): 2007, 2008
- Glengarth Sevens
  - Davenport Plate (1): 1984

== Notable former players ==
=== Scotland internationalists ===
The following former Selkirk players have represented Scotland at full international level.

- (Scotland) Jim Inglis
- (Scotland) Ronnie Cowan
- (Scotland) Gregor MacKenzie
- (Scotland) Stan Cowan
- (Scotland) Iwan Tukalo
- (Scotland) John Rutherford
- (Scotland) Jock King
- (Scotland) Iain Paxton
- (Scotland) Alex Dunbar
- (Scotland) Graham Marshall
- (Scotland) Jock Waters
- (Scotland) Lee Jones
- (Scotland) Willie Bryce

=== South ===
The following former Selkirk players have represented South at provincial level.

- (Scotland) Jim Inglis
- (Scotland) J. Cowan
- (Scotland) A. D. Little
- (Scotland) L. Walker
- (Scotland) Stan Cowan
- (Scotland) Willie Bryce
- (Scotland) Jock King
- (Scotland) Mick Linton
