= Berwick Sevens =

Annual rugby sevens event

- Sport: Rugby sevens
- Instituted: 1983
- Number of teams: 16
- Country: England
- Holders: (Scotland) Watsonians (2019)
- Most titles: (Scotland) Jed-Forest (7 titles)
- Related competition: Kings of the Sevens

Berwick Sevens is an annual rugby sevens event held by Berwick RFC, in Berwick upon Tweed, England. The Berwick Sevens was the last of the Border Sevens tournaments to be instated, in 1983; but the first in England.

The main Borders Sevens tournaments combine in a Kings of the Sevens league; and the Berwick Sevens are now part of this league.

2019's Berwick Sevens was played on 21 April 2019. Watsonians won the final, beating Boroughmuir 24–17.

== Invited Sides ==
Various sides have been invited to play in the Berwick Sevens tournament throughout the years. Stoke RFC made it to the final of the tournament in 1984, only to be beaten by Kelso.

== Sponsorship ==
2019's Sevens tournament was sponsored by Kelso & Lothian Harvesters. 2018's tournament was sponsored by Sanderson McCreath and Edney; Berwick Solicitors.

== Past winners ==
- 2023 (Scotland) Edinburgh Accies
- 2022 (Scotland) Jed-Forest
- 2021 no tournament - coronavirus pandemic
- 2020 no tournament - coronavirus pandemic
- 2019 (Scotland) Watsonians
- 2018 (Scotland) Watsonians
- 2017 (Scotland) Jed-Forest
- 2016 (Scotland) Jed-Forest
- 2015 (Scotland) Gala
- 2014 (Scotland) Gala
- 2013 (Scotland) Watsonians
- 2012 (Scotland) Jed-Forest
- 2011 (Scotland) Jed-Forest
- 2010 (Scotland) Selkirk
- 2009 (Scotland) Watsonians
- 2008 (Scotland) Kelso
- 2007 (Scotland) Watsonians
- 2006 (Scotland) Jed-Forest
- 2005 (Scotland) Jed-Forest
- 2004 (Scotland) Gala
- 2003 (Scotland) Jed-Forest
- 2002 (Scotland) Melrose
- 1987 - 2001 No event held
- 1986 (England) Berwick
- 1985 (Scotland) Kelso
- 1984 (Scotland) Kelso
- 1983 (Scotland) Kelso

== See also ==
- Berwick RFC
- Borders Sevens Circuit
- Scottish Rugby Union
