= Graham Shiel =

Scotland international rugby union player

- Born: Andrew Graham Shiel; 13 August 1970 (age 56) Galashiels, Scotland
- Height: 6 ft 3 in (1.91 m)
- Weight: 14 st 0 lb (89 kg)
- Notable relative(s): Charlie Shiel, son

Rugby union career
- Position: Centre
- Current team: Scotland 7's
Amateur team(s)
Years	Team	Apps	(Points)
1988	Melrose		
1992	Manly		
2006	Stewart’s Melville		
Senior career
Years	Team	Apps	(Points)
-	Border Reivers		
–	Edinburgh Rugby		
International career
Years	Team	Apps	(Points)
1991-2000	Scotland	18	(20)
–	Barbarians		
National sevens team
Years	Team		Comps
1996	Scotland 7's		
Coaching career
- Years: Team
- 2006: Stewart’s Melville (Player-coach)
- 2006-10: Edinburgh Rugby (Academy coach)
- 2010 -: Scotland 7s (Skills coach)

Graham Shiel (born 13 August 1970 in Galashiels, Scotland ) is a former skills coach of the Scotland rugby 7's team. He is now retired from playing rugby, having made 18 appearances for the Scotland national rugby union team and once for the national sevens team.

Shiel is currently the Head coach of amateur side Boroughmuir RFC, he's was previously the head coach of the Super Series (Scottish rugby union competition) semi-professional team Boroughmuir Bears but as the Series came to an end and discontinued in mid 2024 he is now the Head Coach of the club itself at National 1 level.

== Rugby union Career ==
=== Amateur career ===
He played with Melrose RFC from 1988 for fifteen years winning five National Championship and five Border League titles with them.

He played for the Australian amateur club Manly in 1992.

He later joined Stewart's Melville.

=== Professional career ===
He played for Border Reivers - and then Edinburgh Rugby where he was captain from 2000 to 2002.

=== International career ===
Shiel's international debut was against Ireland at Murrayfield in October 1991. His last international appearance was against New Zealand at Auckland in July 2000.

He represented Scotland at the Hong Kong Sevens in 1996.

Shiel was also capped by the Barbarians.

=== Coaching career ===
He first took on a coaching role while still a player at Stewart's Melville.

In 2006 he became academy manager at Edinburgh Rugby.

In October 2010 he was named as Scotland’s seven’s coach. In 2012 was moved to sevens skills coach.

== Outside of rugby ==
He is a qualified stonemason.
