= Walter Hart (rugby union) =

Scottish rugby union player (born 1935)

- Born: 30 March 1935 (age 91) Newtown St Boswells, Scotland

Rugby union career
- Position: Wing-forward
International career
Years	Team	Apps	(Points)
1960	Scotland	1	(0)

Walter Hart (born 30 March 1935) is a Scottish former international rugby union player.

Born in Newtown St Boswells, Hart was a centre when he came to Melrose RFC in the mid-1950s, before being developed into a wing-forward. He made over 200 appearances for Melrose.

Hart represented South of Scotland and twice attended Scottish trials prior to getting a national call up in 1960, for a short tour of South Africa. His opportunity arose when Ken Smith was forced to pull out due to business commitments. He gained his solitary Scotland cap in the one-off Test against the Springboks at Port Elizabeth.

== See also ==
- List of Scotland national rugby union players
