= Donald Scott (rugby union) =

Scotland international rugby union player (1928–2024)

- Born: Donald Macdonald Scott; 15 April 1928 Langholm, Dumfries and Galloway, Scotland
- Died: 22 June 2024 (aged 96) Edinburgh, Scotland

Rugby union career
- Position(s): Centre, wing
Amateur team(s)
Years	Team	Apps	(Points)
- Langholm
–	Watsonians		
Provincial / State sides
Years	Team	Apps	(Points)
- South
-	Edinburgh District		
International career
Years	Team	Apps	(Points)
1950–53	Scotland	10	(0)

Donald Macdonald Scott (15 April 1928 – 22 June 2024) was a Scotland international rugby union player. Normally a centre, he also played on the wing.

== Rugby career ==
=== Amateur career ===
Scott played for – and was internationally capped whilst at – Langholm and Watsonians.

=== Provincial career ===
He broke through while playing with Langholm to play for the South. He was part of the South team that beat North 10 points to 9 on 11 November 1950.

Whilst with Watsonians he played for Edinburgh District. He played in the 1952–53 season's Inter-City match but lost to Glasgow District.

He played in the Scottish Inter-District Championship in its first season. In that 1953–54 season, Edinburgh District won the first championship.

=== International career ===
He was capped for Scotland 11 times from 1950 to 1953, playing in nine Five Nations matches. He was capped at Centre and Wing.

He never scored an international try, though during the Five Nations match against England in 1950, both he and teammate Donald Sloan pounced on a high kick over the try line. As both got up, Scott patted Sloan on the back and the try was awarded to Sloan.

Scott also played in Scotland's 44–0 defeat to South Africa in 1951. He remembered: "When I played in any match there were three things I thought the man opposite me might do:- they would run at me and try to beat me; they would run at me and pass the ball; or they would kick the ball. Well, the South Africans did all that, but they also did something I had never seen before: they ran into you. They looked at you and said: come and take me. You watch rugby now and it is all about contact, and laying the ball off in different ways. That was the first time I saw that approach."

== Outside of rugby ==
Scott was a teacher at George Watson's College. He coached the school's 1st XV at rugby union. Scott died at the Royal Infirmary of Edinburgh on 22 June 2024, at the age of 96.
