= Langholm RFC =

Scottish rugby union club, based in Langholm

(Scotland) Langholm RFC
- Full name: Langholm Rugby Football Club
- Union: Scottish Rugby Union
- Emblem(s): Emblem Incorporates Scottish Thistle, rugby ball and posts, 1871 the year the club was founded and part of the towns arms
- Founded: 1871; 155 years ago
- Ground: Milntown
- League(s): East Division 1 and Border League
- 2024–25: East Division 1, 3rd of 8
Team kit

Official website
- www.pitchero.com/clubs/langholm/

Langholm Rugby Football Club are a rugby union team founded in 1871. They play their home games at Milntown, Langholm, Dumfries and Galloway.

The team currently play in the East Regional League Division One

== Langholm Sevens ==
The Langholm Sevens tournament is hosted by the club. It held around the end of April each year and is part of the Borders Sevens Circuit. The tournament first started in 1908.

== Notable former players ==
- Tom Scott, Scotland and president of the Scottish Football Union from 1918 to 1920
- Billy Steele, 23 caps for Scotland, 1969.British and Irish Lions 1974 South Africa
- Ernie Michie, Scotland, British and Irish Lions, Barbarian F.C.
- Christy Elliot, 1958
- Donald Scott, 1950
- Tommy Elliot, 1968
- Chuck Muir, 1997 Scottish Football Union International Referee
- Ally Ratcliffe (née Little), 2000 & Scottish Football Union Hall of Fame Inductee 2021
- Jilly McCord, 2004
- Lisa Thomson, 2017

== Honours ==
- Scottish Unofficial Championship
  - Champions (1): 1958-59
- Border League
  - Champions (1): 1958-59
- Langholm Sevens
  - Champions (1): 1959
- Kelso Sevens
  - Champions (1): 1953
- Hawick Sevens
  - Champions (1): 1899
- Gala Sevens
  - Champions (2): 1951, 1955
- Earlston Sevens
  - Champions (1): 1954
- Selkirk Sevens
  - Champions (2): 1949, 1958
- Ardrossan Sevens
  - Champions (2): 1963, 1968

== See also ==
- Langholm
- Border League
- Borders Sevens Circuit
