= Philiphaugh Stadium =

Rugby union ground in Selkirk, Scotland

Coordinates: 55°32′51″N 2°51′26″W

Philiphaugh is a rugby union ground in the Royal Burgh of Selkirk, Scotland with a capacity of approximately 6,000. It is the home of Selkirk Rugby Football Club, who currently play in Scottish Hydro Electric Premiership Division One and the Border League.

Rugby was first recorded being played in the town of Selkirk in 1877, not far from the ground's current site. However it was Selkirk Cricket Club who first used the current pitch, before moving to larger premises. Selkirk RFC first played at Philiphaugh in September 1926.

The Border Reivers professional team played their first game at Philiphaugh in 1999.
