= Jimmy Kerr =

Scotland international rugby union player and cricketer

- Born: James Mitchell Kerr; 12 May 1910 Edinburgh, Scotland
- Died: 3 January 1998 (aged 87)

Rugby union career
- Position: Fullback
Senior career
Years	Team	Apps	(Points)
- Heriot's RFC
International career
Years	Team	Apps	(Points)
1935–1937	Scotland	5	(0)

James Mitchell Kerr (12 May 1910 – 3 January 1998) was a Scottish international rugby and cricket player.

== Career ==
Kerr was capped for Scotland between 1935 and 1937. He also played for Heriot's RFC.

== See also ==
- List of Scottish cricket and rugby union players
