= Willie Bryce =

Scotland international rugby union player

- Born: William Erskine Bryce; 16 January 1901 Bolton, England
- Died: 22 February 1983 (aged 81) Melrose, Scotland

Rugby union career
- Position: Scrum half
Amateur team(s)
| Years | Team | Apps | (Points) |
- Selkirk
Provincial / State sides
| Years | Team | Apps | (Points) |
- South of Scotland District
International career
| Years | Team | Apps | (Points) |
| 1922-24 | Scotland | 11 | (9) |
- Field hockey career
- Sport: Field hockey
Senior career
| Years | Team | Caps | Goals |
| – | Selkirk | - | - |
National team
| Years | Team | Caps | Goals |
| – | Scotland | 15 | - |

Willie Bryce (16 January 1901 – 22 February 1983) was a Scotland international rugby union player with his regular playing position being Scrum half; and a Scotland international field hockey player.

== Rugby Union career ==
=== Amateur career ===
Bryce played for Selkirk.

=== Provincial career ===
Bryce played for South of Scotland District.

=== International career ===
Bryce was capped for Scotland 11 times, between 1922 and 1924. He scored 3 tries for his country.

On his last match for Scotland, against Ireland in 1924, he suffered a shoulder injury which ended his rugby union career; and forced Bryce to switch sports.

== Field Hockey career ==
=== Club career ===
Bryce played field hockey for Selkirk. He played on several occasions at Berwick.

=== International career ===
Bryce won 15 international caps for Scotland.
