= Thomas Wright (rugby) =

Scotland dual-code rugby international footballer

- Born: 18 December 1924 Hawick, Scotland
- Died: 2 May 1990 (aged 65)

Rugby union career
- Position: Centre
Senior career
Years	Team	Apps	(Points)
- Hawick RFC
International career
Years	Team	Apps	(Points)
1947	Scotland		
- Rugby league career

Playing information
Club
Years	Team	Pld	T	G	FG	P
1948–50	Leeds	17				9

Thomas Wright (18 December 1924 – 2 May 1990) was a Scottish rugby union and rugby league footballer.

== Rugby union ==
Wright was born in Hawick. He was capped once for Scotland in 1947. He also played for Hawick RFC.

== Rugby league ==
Wright transferred to Leeds in 1948–1949.

== Footnotes ==
- Bath, Richard, ed. (2007). The Scotland Rugby Miscellany. London: Vision Sports Publishing. ISBN 978-1-905326-24-2.
