= Bob Grieve (rugby union) =

Scotland international rugby union player

- Born: Robert George Moir Grieve; 1 February 1911 St Boswells, Scotland
- Died: 13 August 2000 (aged 89) Chiltern District, England

Rugby union career
- Position: Prop
Amateur team(s)
Years	Team	Apps	(Points)
- Kelso
Provincial / State sides
Years	Team	Apps	(Points)
1936	South of Scotland District		
1938	Scotland Possibles		
1938	Scotland Probables		
International career
Years	Team	Apps	(Points)
1935-36	Scotland	7	(0)

Bob Grieve (1 February 1911 - 13 August 2000) was a Scotland international rugby union player.

== Rugby Union career ==
=== Amateur career ===
Grieve played for Kelso.

=== Provincial career ===
He played for South of Scotland District against North of Scotland District on 21 November 1936.

He was due to play for the South of Scotland District against the combined North of Scotland side on 20 November 1937 but he had to withdraw due to an ankle injury.

He played for the Scotland Possibles side against the Scotland Probables side in the final trial match of the 1937-38 season to determine international selection. He impressed the selectors in the first half and then turned out for the Probables in the second half.

=== International career ===
He was capped seven times for Scotland, between 1935 and 1936.

Although not Kelso's first Scotland international, when Grieve was first capped in 1935 along with his teammate Gordon Cottington, this was the first time that Kelso provided 2 players in the same Scotland squad.

=== Administrative career ===
After his playing career ended he became a selector for the South of Scotland District. He was deemed one of the 'big five' South selectors: along with A. Bowie (Hawick), J. D. H. Hastie (Melrose), T. Henderson (Selkirk) and G. Wood (Gala).

He also was a selector for Kelso.

== Business career ==
Grieve was a building contractor. He hit the headlines of the Jedburgh Gazette on 1 April 1938 for non-rugby reasons when he paid the fine of one of his employees, George Scott, after Scott had a drunken feud with his own brother and he was arrested for breach of the peace. Grieve was dubbed a 'good samaritan'.

He made the Hawick Express of 17 January 1951 for rather more unfortunate reasons when they reported that Grieve was in a car-crash at St. Boswells the week before, and that he ended up in hospital as a result.
