= Jock King =

Scotland international rugby union player

- Born: John Hope Fairbairn King; 10 April 1925
- Died: 8 September 1982 (aged 57)

Rugby union career
- Position: Hooker
Amateur team(s)
Years	Team	Apps	(Points)
- Selkirk
Provincial / State sides
Years	Team	Apps	(Points)
- South
International career
Years	Team	Apps	(Points)
1953-54	Scotland	4	(0)

Jock King (10 April 1925 – 8 September 1982) was a former Scotland international rugby union player. King played as a Hooker.

== Rugby union career ==
=== Amateur career ===
King played for Selkirk.

King won the unofficial Scottish championship and the Border League with Selkirk in 1952-53 season.

=== Provincial career ===
King represented South.

=== International career ===
King was capped for Scotland 4 times from 1953 to 1954.

=== Coaching career ===
King was to later coach the Selkirk Under 18 side.
