= Douglas Jackson (rugby union) =

Scotland rugby union player (1941–2018)

Doug Jackson
- Full name: William Douglas Jackson
- Born: 5 December 1941 Hawick, Scotland
- Died: 29 January 2018 (aged 76) Melrose, Scotland
- Height: 5 ft 10 in (1.78 m)
- Weight: 76 kg (12 st 0 lb; 168 lb)
- School: Hawick High School

Rugby union career
- Position: Wing
Senior career
Years	Team	Apps	(Points)
1958–1970	Hawick	242	
International career
Years	Team	Apps	(Points)
1964–1969	Scotland	8	
Coaching career
- Years: Team
- South of Scotland under-21 team

William Douglas Jackson (5 December 1941 – 29 January 2018) was a Scottish rugby union player. He played on the wing for Hawick and won 8 international caps representing the Scotland national rugby union team.

== Early life ==
He was born on 5 December 1941 in Hawick, Scotland. He was educated at Hawick High School.

== Rugby career ==
Jackson made his debut for Hawick in 1958. He was a winger who stood 5 foot 10 inches tall and weighed 12 stones. In the 1969–70 season he scored 29 tries and equalled the club record.

His first international appearance was against Ireland at Lansdowne Road on 22 February 1964. His last test appearance for Scotland was against England at Twickenham on 15 March 1969.

He was later the manager of the South of Scotland under-21 team. At Hawick he was President and Sevens convener. He was director of Rugby at Hawick for a few years, until 2012.

He died on 29 January 2018 in Borders General Hospital, Melrose, aged 76.
