= Scottish Cup (rugby union) =

Rugby union tournament in Scotland

- Organiser(s): Scottish Rugby Union
- Founded: 1995; 31 years ago
- Region: Scotland
- Teams: 19 (2025–26)
- Related competitions: National League Cup; National Shield; National Bowl
- Current champions: Ayr (5th title)
- Most championships: Ayr; (5 titles)
- Website: scottishrugby.org

The Scottish Cup is the annual knock-out cup competition for domestic rugby union clubs in Scotland. The cup has been competed for since the 1995–96 season. Despite many structural changes the competition has always culminated with the final at Murrayfield Stadium.

== Format ==
Clubs in the 10-team Premiership and National League Division 1 compete in an unseeded knockout tournament, with four matches in the first round prior to the last 16.

As part of Silver Saturday at Murrayfield in April, the finals of the associated National League Cup, Shield, and Bowl competitions are also held. These take place on the main Murrayfield Stadium pitch and at the adjacent Edinburgh Rugby Stadium along with the equivalent Women's tournaments (Sarah Beaney Cup, Shield, and Plate).

The National League Cup is contested by the 30 clubs in National League Divisions 2, 3 and 4. The National Shield is played on a regional basis with two Caledonia, three East and three West region clubs progressing into national quarter-finals. The National Bowl is for all remaining regional league clubs, with four local competitions each producing a winner for the national semi-finals.

== History ==
Since the 2017–18 season when the National League Cup was introduced, entry to the Scottish Cup has been restricted to the top two divisions of Scottish rugby.

Prior to this clubs in the three National Leagues competed in the first round, with six Premiership sides added in the second round, and the final four Premiership teams added in the third round of the competition.

The Cup has also been played on a regional or group basis prior to the knock-out rounds in the past, while the Shield was initially introduced as an additional competition for clubs eliminated in the early rounds of the Cup.

The competition was in abeyance between 2019 and 2022, initially due to the COVID-19 pandemic, and made its return in the 2022–23 season.

== Cup Finals ==
A total of 14 clubs have appeared in the final, of whom 9 have won the competition.

Ed.	Season	Winners	Score	Runners-up
1	1995–96	Hawick	17–15	Watsonians
2	1996–97	Melrose*	31–23	Boroughmuir
3	1997–98	Glasgow Hawks	36–14	Kelso
4	1998–99	Gala	8–3	Kelso
5	1999–2000	Boroughmuir	35–10	Glasgow Hawks
6	2000–01	Boroughmuir (2)	39–15	Melrose
7	2001–02	Hawick (2)*	20–17 (a.e.t.)	Glasgow Hawks
8	2002–03	Heriot's	25–13	Watsonians
9	2003–04	Glasgow Hawks (2)*	29–17	Dundee HSFP
10	2004–05	Boroughmuir (3)	39–25	Dundee HSFP
11	2005–06	Watsonians	31–15	Currie
12	2006–07	Glasgow Hawks (3)	24–13	Edinburgh Academicals
13	2007–08	Melrose (2)	31–24	Heriot's
14	2008–09	Heriot's (2)	21–19	Melrose
15	2009–10	Ayr	26–23	Melrose
16	2010–11	Ayr (2)	25–21	Melrose
17	2011–12	Gala (2)	24–10	Ayr
18	2012–13	Ayr (3)*	28–25 (a.e.t.)	Melrose
19	2013–14	Heriot's (3)	31–10	Glasgow Hawks
20	2014–15	Boroughmuir (4)	55–17	Hawick
21	2015–16	Heriot's (4)*	21–13	Melrose
22	2016–17	Melrose (3)	23–18	Ayr
23	2017–18	Melrose (4)*	45–12	Stirling County
24	2018–19	Ayr (4)*	27–25	Heriot's FP
–	2019–22	(no competition held)		
25	2022–23	Hawick (3)*	31–13	Marr
26	2023–24	Hawick (4)	32–29	Edinburgh Academicals
27	2024–25	GHA	52–30	Glasgow Academicals
28	2025–26	Ayr (5)	31–26	Currie

Notes

- a.e.t. – after extra time
- * – winning team were also Scottish Premiership champions

== Scottish Cup Wins by Club ==
- Ayr: 5
- Boroughmuir: 4
- Heriot's: 4
- Melrose: 4
- Hawick: 4
- Glasgow Hawks: 3
- Gala: 2
- GHA: 1
- Watsonians: 1

== Scottish SuperCup ==
In season 2006–07 Premiership One consisted of only 10 clubs, a situation that saw a supplementary competition, the Scottish SuperCup created. The competition included the 10 clubs split into two groups of 5, with the pool winners meeting in a Final at Myreside. With Premiership One reverting to 12 clubs again for 2007–08, it was abandoned after only one season.
