= Tommy Gray (rugby union) =

Scotland international rugby union player

- Born: Thomas Gray; 20 January 1917
- Died: 3 April 2000 (aged 83) Edinburgh, Scotland

Rugby union career
- Position: Full Back / Fly-half
Amateur team(s)
Years	Team	Apps	(Points)
- Heriots
1947-	Northampton		
–	Heriots		
Provincial / State sides
Years	Team	Apps	(Points)
- East Midlands
International career
Years	Team	Apps	(Points)
1950-51	Scotland	3	(10)

Tommy Gray (20 January 1917 – 3 April 2000) was a Scotland international rugby union player. He played at Full Back and Fly-half.

== Rugby career ==
=== Amateur career ===
Gray started with Heriots as a graduate of Heriot's College in Edinburgh. He moved to Northampton to play for the Saints in 1947. He later moved back to Edinburgh to play for Heriots.

=== Provincial career ===
While with Northampton he played for East Midlands.

=== International career ===
Gray played five Services internationals for Scotland between 1942 and 1944.

Gray was capped three times for Scotland. Notably he won the Calcutta Cup against England at Murrayfield Stadium in 1950 by kicking the match-winning conversion.

== Outside of rugby ==
As a King's Own Scottish Borderer, Gray had half of his left foot blown off by an anti-tank shell in the Second World War when in the Netherlands, near Kasteel Blijenbeek. Working for an insurance company, he was posted to Northampton; a town at the centre of the shoe industry. Gray had special boots made and this allowed him to play rugby and also kick conversions and penalties.
