= Selkirk Sevens =

Annual Scottish rugby sevens tournament

- Sport: Rugby sevens
- Instituted: 1919
- Number of teams: 16
- Country: Scotland
- Holders: (Scotland) Selkirk (2024)
- Related competition: Kings of the Sevens

Selkirk Sevens is an annual rugby sevens event held by Selkirk RFC, in Selkirk, Scotland. This was one of a group of Sevens tournaments instated after the First World War extending the original Borders Spring Circuit. The Selkirk Sevens began in 1919.

The Selkirk Sevens is part of the Kings of the Sevens championship run by the Border League.

2025's Selkirk Sevens will be played on 10 May 2025.

== Sports Day ==
The Selkirk Sevens tournament began as a Sports Day in 1919.

== Cup ==
Following a sponsorship deal the Selkirk Sevens trophy is now known as the Edinburgh Medics of 81 Cup.

The Player of the Tournament receives the Denzil Lloyd Trophy.

== Invited Sides ==
Various sides have been invited to play in the Selkirk Sevens tournament throughout the years.

The Scotland 7s team won the tournament in 1996.

Wakefield, Nottingham, Northampton Saints, Rotherham Titans, Newcastle Falcons and Cardiff RFC have all won the tournament. Wakefield won in 1987; Nottingham won in 1990; Saints have won in 1991 and 1993; Titans won in 2002 and 2003; Falcons won in 2004 and Cardiff won in 2006.

Other invited teams made it to the Selkirk Sevens final. A Queens University Belfast rugby side was invited in 1970 and were Runners-Up. Other Runners-Up:- A Welsh Select side (1977); Orrell (1981); Rosslyn Park of London (1984), Harlequins (1987) and Wales 7s (1996).

Dave Scully playing with Wakefield in 1987, won the Sevens again with Rotherham Titans in 2002, fifteen years later.

== Sponsorship ==
The Selkirk financial firm Heard Hamilton Financial Planning sponsors the 2019 Selkirk Sevens. In the past the event was sponsored by Selkirk Taxis and CIS Insurance.

== Past winners ==
- 2024 (Scotland) Selkirk
- 2023 (Scotland) Melrose
- 2022 (Scotland) Jed-Forest
- 2021 Cancelled due to COVID-19
- 2020 Cancelled due to COVID-19
- 2019 (Scotland) Boroughmuir
- 2018 (Scotland) Selkirk
- 2017 (Scotland) Melrose
- 2016 (Scotland) Melrose
- 2015 (Scotland) Jed-Forest
- 2014 (Scotland) Melrose
- 2013 (Scotland) Selkirk
- 2012 (Scotland) Watsonians
- 2011 (Scotland) Selkirk
- 2010 No event
- 2009 (Scotland) Selkirk
- 2008 (Scotland) Selkirk
- 2007 (Scotland) Selkirk
- 2006 (Wales) Cardiff
- 2005 (Scotland) Royal Scots
- 2004 (England) Newcastle Falcons
- 2003 (England) Rotherham Titans
- 2002 (England) Rotherham Titans
- 2001 (Scotland) Royal Scots
- 2000 (Scotland) Melrose
- 1999 (Scotland) Jed-Forest
- 1998 (Scotland) Melrose
- 1997 (Scotland) Kelso
- 1996 Scotland 7s
- 1995 (Scotland) Melrose
- 1994 (Scotland) Selkirk
- 1993 (England) Northampton Saints
- 1992 (Scotland) Gala
- 1991 (England) Northampton Saints
- 1990 (England) Nottingham
- 1989 (Scotland) Selkirk
- 1988 (Scotland) Selkirk
- 1987 (England) Wakefield
- 1986 (Scotland) Hawick
- 1985 (Scotland) Melrose
- 1984 (Scotland) Kelso
- 1983 (Scotland) Kelso
- 1982 (Scotland) Selkirk
- 1981 (Scotland) Hawick
- 1980 (Scotland) Kelso
- 1979 (Scotland) Kelso
- 1978 (Scotland) Kelso
- 1977 (Scotland) Stewart's Melville
- 1976 (Scotland) Stewart's Melville
- 1975 (Scotland) Co-Optimists
- 1974 (Scotland) Kelso
- 1973 (Scotland) Kelso
- 1972 (England) Public School Wanderers
- 1971 (Scotland) Gala
- 1970 (Scotland) Gala
- 1969 (Scotland) Hawick
- 1968 (Scotland) Gala
- 1967 (Scotland) Hawick
- 1966 (Scotland) Hawick
- 1965 (Scotland) Melrose
- 1964 (Scotland) Gala
- 1963 (Scotland) Gala
- 1962 (Scotland) Gala
- 1961 (Scotland) Melrose
- 1960 (Scotland) Selkirk
- 1959 (Scotland) Hawick
- 1958 (Scotland) Langholm
- 1957 (Scotland) Hawick
- 1956 (Scotland) Jed-Forest
- 1955 (Scotland) Kelso
- 1954 (Scotland) Hawick
- 1953 (Scotland) Hawick
- 1952 (Scotland) Gala
- 1951 (Scotland) Melrose
- 1950 (Scotland) Gala
- 1949 (Scotland) Langholm
- 1948 (Scotland) Kelso
- 1947 (Scotland) Co-Optimists
- 1946 (Scotland) Melrose
- 1945 (Scotland) Scottish Services
- 1940–1944 No event due to World War II
- 1939 (Scotland) Hawick
- 1938 (Scotland) Co-Optimists
- 1937 (Scotland) Co-Optimists
- 1936 (Scotland) Kelso
- 1935 (Scotland) Heriots
- 1934 (Scotland) Kelso
- 1933 (Scotland) Hawick
- 1932 (Scotland) Melrose
- 1931 (Scotland) Kelso
- 1930 (Scotland) Hawick
- 1929 (Scotland) Kelso
- 1928 (Scotland) Kelso
- 1927 (Scotland) Hawick
- 1926 (Scotland) Heriots
- 1925 (Scotland) Gala
- 1924 (Scotland) Hawick
- 1923 (Scotland) Selkirk
- 1922 (Scotland) Selkirk
- 1921 (Scotland) Gala
- 1920 (Scotland) Selkirk
- 1919 (Scotland) Hawick

== See also ==
- Selkirk RFC
- Borders Sevens Circuit
- Scottish Rugby Union
