= Rob Welsh =

- Full name: Robert Brown Welsh
- Born: 2 February 1943 (age 83) Hawick, Scotland

Rugby union career
- Position: Centre
International career
Years	Team	Apps	(Points)
1967	Scotland	2	(0)

Robert Brown Welsh (born 2 February 1943) is a Scottish former international rugby union player.

Born in Hawick, Welsh played for hometown club Hawick RFC and had particular success in rugby sevens, as one of three to play in every one of their sides which won ten successive tournaments during the 1960s.

Welsh, a joiner by profession, was a strongly built centre and gained Scotland caps for their final two 1967 Five Nations fixtures, against Ireland at Murrayfield and a Calcutta Cup match at Twickenham.

== Personal life ==
Rob is married to Joyce. They have 4 children and 9 grandchildren. They remain dedicated fans of Hawick RFC.

== See also ==
- List of Scotland national rugby union players
