= Jed-Forest RFC =

Rugby union team in Scottish Borders, Scotland

(Scotland) Jed-Forest
- Full name: Jed-Forest Rugby Football Club
- Union: SRU
- Founded: 1885; 141 years ago
- Location: Jedburgh, Scotland
- Ground: Riverside Park, Jedburgh
- President: John Evans
- Coach: Stuart Johnson
- Captain: Clark Skeldon
- League: Scottish National League Division One
- 2025–26: Scottish National League Division One, 8th of 10
Team kit

Official website
- jedforest.com

Jed-Forest Rugby Football Club are a rugby union team who are based at Riverside Park in Jedburgh.

The team was founded in 1885 and currently play in National League 1 (rugby) and the Border League.

== Jed-Forest Sevens ==
The club organises the Jed-Forest Sevens every year.

== Honours ==
- Scottish National League Division One
  - Champions (2): 1987–88, 2011–12
  - Runners-Up (1): 2017-18
- Jed-Forest Sevens
  - Champions (14): 1899, 1900, 1902, 1903, 1904, 1922, 1975, 1992, 2001, 2007, 2013, 2015, 2016,2022
- Langholm Sevens
  - Champions (10): 1919, 1920, 1986, 1987, 1988, 1989, 1990, 1994, 2011, 2022
  - Jedforest hold the record of most consecutive victories in the tournament (5): 1986, 1987, 1988, 1989, 1990
- Melrose Sevens
  - Champions (4): 1899, 1902, 1904, 1974
- Hawick Sevens
  - Champions (6): 1896, 1897, 1920, 1989, 1990, 2002
- Gala Sevens
  - Champions (5): 1892, 1899, 1921, 2012, 2018
- Kelso Sevens
  - Champions (7): 1921, 1993, 1994, 2002, 2004, 2006, 2022
- Berwick Sevens
  - Champions (8): 2003, 2005, 2006, 2011, 2012, 2016, 2017, 2022
- Peebles Sevens
  - Champions (2): 2000, 2020
- Earlston Sevens
  - Champions (9): 1924, 1935, 1987, 1992, 1994, 2001, 2003, 2006, 2016
- Selkirk Sevens
  - Champions (4): 1956, 1999, 2015, 2022
- Kings of the Sevens
  - Champions (6): 2001, 2003, 2006, 2012, 2016, 2022
- Hawick Linden Sevens
  - Champions (1): 2017
- Kilmarnock Sevens
  - Champions (1): 1983
- Border Park Tens
  - Champions (1) : 2023

== Notable former players ==
- Gary Armstrong
- Gavin Kerr
- Roy Laidlaw
- Thomas "Tom" McKinney
- Charles "Charlie" Renilson
- David Rose
- Jon Steel
- George Douglas
- Greig Laidlaw
- Iain Smith (the flying scotsman)

== See also ==
- Jedburgh
- Border League
- Borders Sevens Circuit
