= Doug Davies (rugby union) =

British Lions & Scotland international rugby union player

Douglas S. Davies (23 July 1899 – 9 March 1987) was a Scottish international rugby union player, who played for Scotland and the British & Irish Lions at number 8.

Davies was born in Ashkirk, Scottish Borders. He was capped 24 times for Scotland.

He also played for Hawick RFC, and was on the 1924 British Lions tour to South Africa.

He died, aged, 87, in Peel, Isle of Man.
