= Earlston Sevens =

Annual Scottish rugby sevens tournament

- Sport: Rugby sevens
- Instituted: 1923
- Number of teams: 16
- Country: Scotland
- Holders: (England) Durham University (2023)
- Related competition: Kings of the Sevens

Earlston Sevens is an annual rugby sevens event held by Earlston RFC, in Earlston, Scotland. This was one of a group of Sevens tournaments instated after the First World War extending the original Borders Spring Circuit. The Earlston Sevens began in 1923.

The Earlston Sevens is part of the Kings of the Sevens championship run by the Border League.

2019's Earlston Sevens was played on 5 May 2019. It was won by Watsonians.

== Invited Sides ==
Various sides have been invited to play in the Earlston Sevens tournament throughout the years. The Royal Scots army side was invited in 2003.

== Past winners ==
- 2023 (England) Durham University
- 2022 (Scotland) Selkirk
- 2021 Coronavirus pandemic
- 2020 Coronavirus pandemic
- 2019 (Scotland) Watsonians
- 2018 (Scotland) Melrose
- 2017 (Scotland) Gala
- 2016 (Scotland) Jed-Forest
- 2015 (Scotland) Melrose
- 2014 (Scotland) Melrose
- 2013 (Scotland) Melrose
- 2012 (Scotland) Melrose
- 2011 (Scotland) Melrose
- 2010 (Scotland) Melrose
- 2009 (Scotland) Watsonians
- 2008 (Scotland) Watsonians
- 2007 (Scotland) Selkirk
- 2006 (Scotland) Jed-Forest
- 2005 (Scotland) Watsonians
- 2004 (Scotland) Gala
- 2003 (Scotland) Jed-Forest
- 2002 (Scotland) Melrose
- 2001 (Scotland) Jed-Forest
- 2000 (Scotland) Gala
- 1999 West of Scotland
- 1998 (Scotland) Kelso
- 1997 (Scotland) Kelso
- 1996 (Scotland) Melrose
- 1995 (Scotland) Stirling County
- 1994 (Scotland) Jed-Forest
- 1993 (Scotland) Gala
- 1992 (Scotland) Jed-Forest
- 1991 (Scotland) Gala
- 1990 (Scotland) Melrose
- 1989 (Scotland) Gala
- 1988 (Scotland) Gala
- 1987 (Scotland) Jed-Forest
- 1986 (Scotland) Melrose
- 1985 (Scotland) Melrose
- 1984 (Scotland) Kelso
- 1983 No event
- 1982 (Scotland) Melrose
- 1981 (Scotland) Kelso
- 1980 (Scotland) Selkirk
- 1979 (Scotland) Melrose
- 1978 (Scotland) Kelso
- 1977 (Scotland) Melrose
- 1976 (Scotland) Selkirk
- 1975 (Scotland) Selkirk
- 1974 (Scotland) Kelso
- 1973 (Scotland) Kelso
- 1972 (Scotland) Melrose
- 1971 (Scotland) Gala
- 1970 (Scotland) Hawick
- 1969 (Scotland) Hawick
- 1968 (Scotland) Gala
- 1967 (Scotland) Hawick
- 1966 (Scotland) Hawick
- 1965 (Scotland) Melrose
- 1964 (Scotland) Gala
- 1963 (Scotland) Hawick
- 1962 (Scotland) Hawick
- 1961 (Scotland) Hawick
- 1960 (Scotland) Gala
- 1959 (Scotland) Gala
- 1958 (Scotland) Kelso
- 1957 (Scotland) Melrose
- 1956 (Scotland) Hawick
- 1955 (Scotland) Kelso
- 1954 (Scotland) Langholm
- 1953 (Scotland) Hawick
- 1952 (Scotland) Gala
- 1951 (Scotland) Melrose
- 1950 (Scotland) Melrose
- 1949 (Scotland) Melrose
- 1948 (Scotland) Hawick
- 1947 (Scotland) Kelso
- 1946 (Scotland) Hawick
- 1939–1945 Second World War
- 1938 (Scotland) Gala
- 1937 (Scotland) Kelso
- 1936 (Scotland) Kelso
- 1935 (Scotland) Jed-Forest
- 1934 (Scotland) Kelso
- 1933 (Scotland) Selkirk
- 1932 (Scotland) Selkirk
- 1931 (Scotland) Selkirk
- 1930 (Scotland) Gala
- 1929 (Scotland) Selkirk
- 1928 (Scotland) Gala
- 1927 (Scotland) Gala
- 1926 (Scotland) Hawick
- 1925 (Scotland) Hawick
- 1924 (Scotland) Jed-Forest
- 1923 (Scotland) Gala

== See also ==
- Earlston RFC
- Borders Sevens Circuit
- Scottish Rugby Union
