= Melrose RFC =

Scottish rugby union club, based in Melrose

(Scotland) Melrose
- Full name: Melrose Rugby Football Club
- Founded: 1877; 149 years ago
- Location: Melrose, Scotland
- Ground: Greenyards (Capacity: 16,024)
- President: Grant Hogg
- Coach(es): Iain Chisholm & Scott Wight
- Captain: Angus Runciman
- League: Scottish Premiership
- 2025–26: Scottish Premiership, 8th of 10
Team kit

Official website
- melroserugby.org

Melrose Rugby Football Club is a rugby union club located in the town of Melrose in the Scottish Borders. The men's side competes in the Scottish Premiership. The club plays at the Greenyards. The club is synonymous with inventing Rugby sevens and their tournament the Melrose Sevens is one of the most prestigious sevens tournaments in the world.

Between the 2019-2020 and 2023-2024 seasons the club ran a men's professional side known as the Southern Knights which competed in the Super 6 league and Super Sprint competitions.

== History ==
The club was formed in 1877 and was elected to full membership of the Scottish Rugby Union in 1880. The club have played at the Greenyards since the club's inception.

Melrose have been Scottish champions on ten occasions and Scottish cup winners four times. They lifted the Scottish Cup in 1997 to complete a domestic double and have also won the Border League on 17 occasions.

Despite the population of Melrose hovering around 2000 for a number of years the team has been a consistently successful club in the upper echelons of the Scottish game.

== Teams ==
As well as the Super 6 and 1st XV, Melrose have a youth side (Melrose WASPS) and a reserve side (Melrose Storm). The club had a successful Ladies side until 2018.

=== Melrose Ladies ===
Melrose Ladies was one of the top women's teams in Scotland, competing in the Scottish Premiership and the Scottish Cup. The team produced a number of players who went on to represent Scotland. Four members of the current Scotland squad – Lisa Thomson, Lana Skeldon, Lauren Harris and Chloe Rollie – played at Melrose. The team folded in 2018.

=== Melrose Wasps ===
There is an under 18s team called Melrose Wasps, formerly coached by Jim Telfer now by Jerry Brett and Nick Alston . Traditionally over the seasons this team has been competitive in the local Borders League as well as being a top Scottish U18 side playing XV's in the country as well as touring overseas (Monaco in 2018). Melrose Rugby club also have an under-16, under-15, S2, S1, and then all primary ages groups however only start playing matches at Primary 4. The girls section – called the Queen Bees – involves girls from P4-P7. There is a partnership with feeder school Earlston HS.

=== Melrose Storm ===
Melrose's reserve side is known as the Melrose Storm. They broke records by winning the National Reserve League three seasons in a row (2016, 2017 & 2018). They currently play in the top 2nd XV League in Scotland against sides such as Heriots Blues, Stewarts Melville, Hawick, Gala, Edinburgh Accies.

== Sevens tournament ==
Melrose is most famous as the host of the first-ever rugby sevens tournament in 1883, the abbreviated game having been invented by Ned Haig, a local butcher. The first Melrose Sevens was won by Melrose, beating local rivals Gala in the final during extra time. The Melrose Sevens, played on the second Saturday in April every year, remains the most popular Scottish Sevens tournament, regularly attracting crowds in excess of 10,000. In honour of the role of Melrose RFC in the creation of rugby sevens, the club was inducted along with Haig to the IRB Hall of Fame in 2008. Melrose have had some recent success in their home tournament, coming runner-up on a couple of occasions and winning it in 2011. In 2010 they were crowned Kings of the Sevens winning the Kelso, Earlston, Gala and Jedforest sevens and placing respectably in the others.

== The stadium ==
Melrose play at the Greenyards. They have played here since the club was formed. The grandstand has wooden benches and is painted in the club colours; yellow and black.

In 2019 the famous turf of The Greenyards was replaced with a 4G pitch.

== Notable former players ==
=== Scotland internationalists ===
- (Scotland) Craig Chalmers
- (Scotland) Craig Joiner
- (Scotland) Steve Brotherstone
- (Scotland) Jock Allan
- (Scotland) Kelly Brown
- (Scotland) Charlie Drummond
- (Scotland) Matt Proudfoot
- (Scotland) Keith Robertson
- (Scotland) David Chisholm
- (Scotland) George Dobson
- (Scotland) Frank Laidlaw
- (Scotland) Jim Telfer
- (Scotland) Walter Hart
- (Scotland) Derek Stark
- (Scotland) Alex Hastie
- (Scotland) Frank Coutts
- (Scotland) Doddie Weir
- (Scotland) Carl Hogg
- (Scotland) Doug Davies
- (Scotland) Damien Hoyland
- (Scotland) John Hastie
- (Scotland) Craig Smith
- (Scotland) Bryan Redpath
- (Scotland) Les Allan
- (Scotland) Graham Shiel
- (Scotland) Jimmie Johnston
- (Scotland) Robin Chisholm
- (Scotland) Jock Lawrie
- (Scotland) Stewart Campbell
- (Scotland) Jamie Bhatti
- (Scotland) Craig Smith
- (Scotland) Lisa Thomson
- (Scotland) Chloe Rollie
- (Scotland) Lana Skeldon
- (Scotland) Lauren Harris

Olympic Games Mark Robertson Great Britain, Silver Medal, Rugby Sevens 2016

- (United Kingdom)

=== South of Scotland ===
The following former Melrose players have represented South of Scotland at provincial level.

- (Scotland) Robin Chisholm
- (Scotland) D.M. Brown
- (Scotland) Les Allan
- (Scotland) Jimmie Johnston

== Youth rugby ==
There is an under 18s team called Melrose Wasps, formerly coached by the Jim Telfer and now by Jerry Brett and Nick Alston. This XV plays XV's from clubs and schools in Scotland, as well as touring overseas (Monaco 2018). Melrose rugby club also have an under-16, under-15, S2, S1, and then all primary ages groups however only start playing matches at Primary 4. The girls section - called the Queen Bees - involves girls from P4-P7. There is a partnership with catchment school Earlston HS.

== Honours ==
=== Men's ===
- Scottish Premiership
  - Champions (10): 1989–90, 1991–92, 1992–93, 1993–94, 1995–96, 1996–97, 2010–11, 2011–12, 2013–14, 2017–18
  - Runners-Up (2): 2014–15, 2016–17
- Scottish Cup
  - Champions (4): 1996–97, 2007–08, 2016–17, 2017-18
  - Runners-Up (6): 2000–01, 2008–09, 2009–10, 2010–11, 2012–13, 2015–16
- Kelso Sevens
  - Champions (18): 1932, 1933, 1937, 1946, 1947, 1949, 1950, 1952, 1974, 1980, 1988, 1998, 2009, 2011, 2014, 2015, 2016, 2018
- Langholm Sevens
  - Champions (9): 1933, 1947, 1950, 1952, 1963, 1992, 1999, 2002, 2014
- Melrose Sevens
  - Champions (12): 1883, 1885, 1889, 1931, 1947, 1948, 1950, 1952, 1975, 1997, 1998, 2011
- Hawick Sevens
  - Champions (4): 1910, 1958, 1974, 2014
- Gala Sevens
  - Champions (10): 1886, 1889, 1938, 1953, 1962, 1987, 1999, 2000, 2010, 2011
- Berwick Sevens
  - Champions (1): 2002
- Jed-Forest Sevens
  - Champions (11): 1908, 1909, 1910, 1964, 1999, 2003, 2005, 2010, 2011, 2014, 2018
- Peebles Sevens
  - Champions (13): 1932, 1960, 1968, 1970, 1971, 1976, 1979, 2009, 2010, 2013, 2014, 2016, 2018
- Selkirk Sevens
  - Champions (12): 1932, 1946, 1951, 1961, 1965, 1985, 1995, 1998, 2000, 2014, 2016, 2017
- Earlston Sevens
  - Champions (21): 1949, 1950, 1951, 1957, 1965, 1972, 1977, 1979, 1982, 1985, 1986, 1990, 1996, 2002, 2010, 2011, 2012, 2013, 2014, 2015, 2018
  - Melrose hold the record of most consecutive victories in the tournament (6): 2010, 2011, 2012, 2013, 2014, 2015
- Kings of the Sevens
  - Champions (8): 1999, 2000, 2002, 2005, 2010, 2011, 2013, 2014
- Walkerburn Sevens
  - Champions (6): 1932, 1947, 1975, 1987, 2010, 2013

=== Melrose Storm ===
- Walkerburn Sevens
  - Champions (2): 2018, 2019

== See also ==
- Scottish Premiership Division One
- Border League
- Borders Sevens Circuit
