= Kelso Sevens =

Annual Scottish rugby sevens tournament

- Sport: Rugby sevens
- Instituted: 1920
- Number of teams: 16
- Country: Scotland
- Holders: (Scotland) Watsonians (2019)
- Related competition: Kings of the Sevens

Kelso Sevens is an annual rugby sevens event held by Kelso RFC, in Kelso, Scotland. This was one of a group of Sevens tournaments instated after the First World War extending the original Borders Spring Circuit. The Kelso Sevens began in 1920.

The Kelso Sevens is part of the Kings of the Sevens championship run by the Border League.

2019's Kelso Sevens will be played on 4 May 2019.

== Sports Day ==
The Kelso Sevens tournament began as a Sports Day in 1920.

== Invited Sides ==
Various sides have been invited to play in the Kelso Sevens tournament throughout the years.

Scotland 7s won the final in 1996 beating Kenya 7s.

London Scottish won the Kelso Sevens in 1991 and reached the final in 1988.

The Army side Royal Signals of Catterick won in 1954 and 1957 and reached the final in 1953. Cardiff Training College won in 1969 and reached the final in 1967, 1968 and 1972. The English invitational side Public School Wanderers won in 1985 and reached the final in 1986.

== Sponsorship ==
Border Toyota of St. Boswells is sponsoring the 2019 Kelso Sevens.

== Past winners ==
- 2019 (Scotland) Watsonians
- 2018 (Scotland) Melrose
- 2017 (Scotland) Watsonians
- 2016 (Scotland) Melrose
- 2015 (Scotland) Melrose
- 2014 (Scotland) Melrose
- 2013 (Scotland) Watsonians
- 2012 (Scotland) Watsonians
- 2011 (Scotland) Melrose
- 2010 No event
- 2009 (Scotland) Melrose
- 2008 (Scotland) Kelso
- 2007 (Scotland) Selkirk
- 2006 (Scotland) Jed-Forest
- 2005 (Scotland) Selkirk
- 2004 (Scotland) Jed-Forest
- 2003 (Scotland) Gala
- 2002 (Scotland) Jed-Forest
- 2001 (Scotland) Kelso
- 2000 West of Scotland
- 1999 (Scotland) Kelso
- 1998 (Scotland) Melrose
- 1997 (Scotland) Kelso
- 1996 Scotland 7s
- 1995 (Scotland) Kelso
- 1994 (Scotland) Jed-Forest
- 1993 (Scotland) Jed-Forest
- 1992 (Scotland) Presidents VII
- 1991 (England) London Scottish
- 1990 (Scotland) Saltires
- 1989 (Scotland) Kelso
- 1988 (Scotland) Melrose
- 1987 (Scotland) Kelso
- 1986 (Scotland) Kelso
- 1985 (England) Public School Wanderers
- 1984 (Scotland) Selkirk
- 1983 (Scotland) Kelso
- 1982 (Scotland) Kelso
- 1981 (Scotland) Kelso
- 1980 (Scotland) Melrose
- 1979 (Scotland) Stewart's Melville
- 1978 (Scotland) Stewart's Melville
- 1977 (Scotland) Boroughmuir
- 1976 (Scotland) Gala
- 1975 (Scotland) Gala
- 1974 (Scotland) Melrose
- 1973 (Scotland) Kelso
- 1972 (Scotland) Gala
- 1971 (Scotland) Gala
- 1970 (Scotland) Gala
- 1969 (Wales) Cardiff Training College
- 1968 (Scotland) Hawick
- 1967 (Scotland) Hawick
- 1966 (Scotland) Hawick
- 1965 (Scotland) Hawick
- 1964 (Scotland) Gala
- 1963 (Scotland) Hawick
- 1962 (Scotland) Hawick
- 1961 (Scotland) Gala
- 1960 (Scotland) Hawick
- 1959 (Scotland) Hawick
- 1958 (Scotland) Hawick
- 1957 (England) Royal Signals Catterick
- 1956 (Scotland) Gala
- 1955 (Scotland) Musselburgh
- 1954 (England) Royal Signals Catterick
- 1953 (Scotland) Langholm
- 1952 (Scotland) Melrose
- 1951 (Scotland) Hawick
- 1950 (Scotland) Melrose
- 1949 (Scotland) Melrose
- 1948 (Scotland) Kelso
- 1947 (Scotland) Melrose
- 1946 (Scotland) Melrose
- 1945 (Scotland) Hawick
- 1939–1944 Second World War
- 1938 (Scotland) Gala
- 1937 (Scotland) Melrose
- 1936 (Scotland) Kelso
- 1935 (Scotland) Hawick
- 1934 (Scotland) Gala
- 1933 (Scotland) Melrose
- 1932 (Scotland) Melrose
- 1931 (Scotland) Gala
- 1930 (Scotland) Kelso
- 1929 (Scotland) Hawick
- 1928 (Scotland) Kelso
- 1927 (Scotland) Kelso
- 1926 (Scotland) Kelso
- 1925 (Scotland) Hawick
- 1924 (Scotland) Gala
- 1923 (Scotland) Hawick
- 1922 (Scotland) Gala
- 1921 (Scotland) Jed-Forest
- 1920 (Scotland) Gala

== See also ==
- Kelso RFC
- Borders Sevens Circuit
- Scottish Rugby Union
