= Langholm Sevens =

Annual Scottish rugby sevens event

- Sport: Rugby sevens
- Instituted: 1908; 118 years ago
- Number of teams: 16
- Country: Scotland
- Holders: (Scotland) Watsonians (2019)
- Most titles: (Scotland) Hawick (29 titles)
- Related competition: Kings of the Sevens

Langholm Sevens is an annual rugby sevens event held by Langholm RFC, in Langholm, Scotland. The Langholm Sevens was the last of the Border Sevens tournaments to be instated in 1908.

Held around the end of every April, the tournament is part of the Kings of the Sevens competition. 2019's Langholm Sevens took place on 27 April.

== Sports Day ==
Langholm first introduced a Sports Day - as it was originally called - on 16 October 1886; and rugby union seven a sides were played then. Two local teams met; from the firms of James Scott and Sons of Waverley Mills and Hotson the Builders. James Scott and Sons won the match.

However it wasn't until 1908 that Langholm RFC decided that they should hold an annual Sports Day and thus the Sevens tournament today dates from then. Eight teams from the Borders were invited to play on 1 May 1908.

== Scott Cup ==
The winner of the Langholm Sevens receives the Scott Cup.

The Scott Cup was first presented to the winners in 1930. It was presented by Tom Scott; the first Langholm RFC player to be capped internationally by Scotland (in 1896), and the first Border man to be president of the Scottish Rugby Union (from 1914 to 1920).

== Longest match in Sevens history ==
The final of the 1920 Langholm Sevens is understood to be the longest match in Sevens history.

Jed-Forest played Edinburgh Wanderers in that match, which was played with two halves of ten minutes each. After 20 minutes had expired with the score at 0-0, both captains and the referee agreed to play another two halves of ten minutes, which also ended without any score.

Following this, the captains and referee agreed to play under a 'golden try' rule: if either team scored a try, it would end the match, and the scoring team would win the match (and the competition).

After another five minutes, Jed-Forest fly-half Willie Scott touched down for a try to finally break the deadlock. The final had lasted a total of 45 minutes.

== Invited Sides ==
Various sides have been invited to play in the Langholm Sevens tournament throughout the years. The Barbarians entered in a side in 1972, reaching the final. The Scotland 7s side was invited in 2000. Loughborough Colleges reached the final in 1995, losing out to Glasgow High Kelvinside. Aspatria reached the final in 1990. London Scottish reached the final in 1993.

Of the English sides so far invited, only Newcastle Falcons and Headingley have won the Scott Cup.

== Past winners ==
- 2023 (Scotland) Kelso
- 2022 (Scotland) Jed-Forest
- 2021 no tournament - coronavirus pandemic
- 2020 no tournament - coronavirus pandemic
- 2019 (Scotland) Watsonians
- 2018 (Scotland) Watsonians
- 2017 (Scotland) Selkirk
- 2016 (Scotland) Watsonians
- 2015 (Scotland) Hawick
- 2014 (Scotland) Melrose
- 2013 (Scotland) Selkirk
- 2012 (Scotland) Hawick
- 2011 (Scotland) Jed-Forest
- 2010 (Scotland) Kelso
- 2009 (Scotland) Hawick
- 2008 (England) Newcastle Falcons
- 2007 (England) Newcastle Falcons
- 2006 (England) Newcastle Falcons
- 2005 (England) Newcastle Falcons
- 2004 (Scotland) Hawick
- 2003 (Scotland) Glasgow Hut. Aloysians
- 2002 (Scotland) Melrose
- 2001 Foot & Mouth Disease
- 2000 (Scotland) Hawick
- 1999 (Scotland) Melrose
- 1998 (Scotland) Gala
- 1997 (Scotland) Kelso
- 1996 (Scotland) Kelso
- 1995 (Scotland) GH Kelvinside
- 1994 (Scotland) Jed-Forest
- 1993 (Scotland) Gala
- 1992 (Scotland) Melrose
- 1991 (Scotland) Hawick
- 1990 (Scotland) Jed-Forest
- 1989 (Scotland) Jed-Forest
- 1988 (Scotland) Jed-Forest
- 1987 (Scotland) Jed-Forest
- 1986 (Scotland) Jed-Forest
- 1985 (Scotland) Hawick
- 1984 (Scotland) Hawick
- 1983 (Scotland) Stewarts Melville
- 1982 (Scotland) Hawick
- 1981 (Scotland) Kelso
- 1980 (Scotland) Hawick
- 1979 (Scotland) Stewarts Melville
- 1978 (Scotland) Boroughmuir
- 1977 (Scotland) Hawick
- 1976 (Scotland) Hawick
- 1975 (Scotland) Boroughmuir
- 1974 (Scotland) Kelso
- 1973 (Scotland) Hawick
- 1972 (Scotland) Gala
- 1971 (England) Headingley
- 1970 (Scotland) Gala
- 1969 (Scotland) Gala
- 1968 (England) Headingley
- 1967 (Scotland) Gala
- 1966 (Scotland) Hawick
- 1965 (Scotland) Stewart's College FP
- 1964 (Scotland) Gala
- 1963 (Scotland) Melrose
- 1962 (Scotland) Hawick
- 1961 (Scotland) Hawick
- 1960 (Scotland) Royal HSFP
- 1959 (Scotland) Langholm
- 1958 (Scotland) Hawick
- 1957 (Scotland) Stewart's College FP
- 1956 (Scotland) Hawick
- 1955 (Scotland) Hawick
- 1954 (Scotland) Heriots
- 1953 (Scotland) Royal HSFP
- 1952 (Scotland) Melrose
- 1951 (Scotland) Stewart's College FP
- 1950 (Scotland) Melrose
- 1949 (Scotland) Royal HSFP
- 1948 (Scotland) Stewart's College FP
- 1947 (Scotland) Melrose
- 1946 (Scotland) Hawick
- 1940-1945 Second World War
- 1939 (Scotland) Heriots
- 1938 (Scotland) Heriots
- 1937 (Scotland) Heriots
- 1936 (Scotland) Co-Optimists
- 1935 (Scotland) Heriots
- 1934 (Scotland) Kelso
- 1933 (Scotland) Melrose
- 1932 (Scotland) Hawick
- 1931 (Scotland) Kelso
- 1930 (Scotland) Kelso
- 1929 (Scotland) Edinburgh Accies
- 1928 (Scotland) Heriots
- 1927 (Scotland) Hawick
- 1926 (Scotland) Heriots
- 1925 (Scotland) Selkirk
- 1924 (Scotland) Gala
- 1923 (Scotland) Hawick
- 1922 (Scotland) Hawick
- 1921 (Scotland) Selkirk
- 1920 (Scotland) Jed-Forest
- 1919 (Scotland) Jed-Forest
- 1915-1918 First World War
- 1914 (Scotland) Hawick
- 1913 (Scotland) Hawick
- 1912 (Scotland) Hawick
- 1911 (Scotland) Hawick
- 1910 (Scotland) Gala
- 1909 (Scotland) Hawick
- 1908 (Scotland) Gala

== Sponsorship ==
Edinburgh Woollen Mill are longstanding sponsors of the tournament.

== See also ==
- Langholm RFC
- Borders Sevens Circuit
- Scottish Rugby Union
