= Heriot's Rugby Club =

Scottish rugby union club, based in Edinburgh

(Scotland) Heriot's
- Union: SRU
- Founded: 1890; 136 years ago
- Location: Edinburgh, Scotland
- Ground: Goldenacre Sports Ground (Capacity: 3,000+)
- President: Stewart Mustard
- Coach: Stuart Edwards
- League(s): Men: Scottish Premiership; Women: Scottish Women's Premiership
- 2025–26: Men: Scottish Premiership, 3rd of 10; Women: Scottish Women's Premiership, 5th of 8
Team kit

Official website
- heriotsrugbyclub.co.uk

Heriot's Rugby Club, formerly known as Heriot's FP, is one of Scotland's senior rugby football clubs in the Scottish Rugby Union. The Men's 1st XV play in the Scottish Premiership and the women play in Scottish Women's Premiership.

Between the 2019-2020 and 2023-2024 seasons the club ran a men's semi-professional side which competed in the Super 6 league and Super Sprint competitions.

== History ==
The club's home is in the Goldenacre area in Edinburgh. The rugby club, founded in 1890, was originally intended for former pupils of George Heriot's School, but is now an open club, welcoming rugby players of all levels.

Player development starts with a Mini/Midi Section and moves on to the senior levels. Heriot's Rugby club are the only Scottish club never to have been relegated from the first division.

The team had Chris Fusaro, called for Scotland A for the IRB Nations Cup, in 2010. He was the only amateur player called and it was announced that he was joining Glasgow Warriors.

== Sevens tournament ==
The club ran an Under 20s Sevens tournament. The teams played for the Goldenacre Cup.

== Notable players ==
- Andy Irvine most capped international (51 caps for Scotland, 1974, 1977, 1980 British and Irish Lions).
- Ken Scotland (27 caps for Scotland, 1959 British and Irish Lions)
- Dan Drysdale (26 caps for Scotland, 1924 British and Irish Lions)
- Jimmy Kerr
- John Craig
- Tommy Gray
- Ian Thomson
- Colin Blaikie
- Ian Smith
- Kenny Milne (39 caps for Scotland, 1993 British and Irish Lions)
- David Milne
- Bruce Douglas
- Simon Taylor (56 caps for Scotland, 2001, 2005 British and Irish Lions)
- John Beattie (25 Caps for Scotland, 1980, 1983, 1986 British and Irish Lions)
- Jimmy Kerr
- Roy Kinnear (3 caps for Scotland, 1929 British and Irish Lions)
- Kelvin Hendrie
- Iain Milne (44 caps for Scotland, 1983 British and Irish Lions)
- Gavin Cameron
- Douglas Muir
- Cornell du Preez
- David Kerr

== Honours ==
=== Men ===
- Scottish Unofficial Championship
  - Champions (5): 1919–20, 1922–23, 1927–28, 1928–29, 1949–50
- Scottish Premiership
  - Champions (5): 1978–79, 1998–99, 1999–00, 2014–15, 2015-16
  - Runners-Up (2): 2004–05, 2008–09
- Scottish Cup
  - Champions: (4) 2002–03, 2008–09, 2013–14, 2015-16
  - Runners-Up: (2) 2007–08, 2018-19

==== Sevens ====
- Heriots Sevens
  - Champions: 1951, 1956, 1957
- Langholm Sevens
  - Champions (6): 1926, 1928, 1937, 1938, 1939, 1954
- Melrose Sevens
  - Champions (4): 1923, 1954, 1957, 1958
- Hawick Sevens
  - Champions (8): 1905, 1922, 1926, 1935, 1942, 1947, 1954, 1999
- Gala Sevens
  - Champions (2): 1973, 2008
- Jed-Forest Sevens
  - Champions (9): 1925, 1933, 1938, 1939, 1955, 1958, 1987, 2006, 2012
- Peebles Sevens
  - Champions (7): 1951, 1953, 1958, 1964, 1978, 1983, 1985
- Selkirk Sevens
  - Champions (2): 1926, 1935
- Walkerburn Sevens
  - Champions (4): 1953, 1954, 1979, 1982
- Middlesex Sevens
  - Champions (1): 1949
- Edinburgh Northern Sevens
  - Champions (5): 1988, 1994, 1999, 2007, 2012
- Huddersfield Sevens
  - Champions: 1951

=== Women ===
- Edinburgh City Sevens
  - Champions (1): 2023
