= Kelso RFC =

Scottish rugby union club, based in Kelso, Scottish Borders

Kelso
- Full name: Kelso Rugby Football Club
- Union: SRU
- Founded: 1876; 150 years ago
- Ground: Poynder Park (Capacity: 3,000)
- Coach(es): Adam Roxburgh & Bruce Millar
- League(s): Men: Tennent’s Premiership; Women: Scottish Women's Midlands & East One
- 2022-23: Men: 1st, promoted from National League One; Women: Scottish Women's Midlands & East Two, 1st of 8 (promoted)
Team kit

Official website
- www.kelsorfc.co.uk

Kelso Rugby Football Club are a Scottish rugby union team founded in 1876. They play their home games at Poynder Park, Kelso in the Scottish Borders.

The men's team currently play in Scottish Premiership and the Border League (the oldest established rugby union league in the world); the women's team play in Scottish Women's Midlands & East One.

== History ==
Kelso RFC won the prestigious Melrose Sevens tournament seven times in the space of 12 years from 1978 to 1989. Kelso were also winners of the Scottish Premiership in 1988 and 1989.

The most recent successes for the club in the 15-a-side game were consecutive Premier League championships in the 1987–88 and 1988–89 seasons. Notably, however, the team also reached the final of the Scottish Cup, played at Murrayfield, in both 1998 and 1999, losing to Glasgow Hawks (36–14) and to local rivals Gala RFC (8–3), respectively.

Adam Roxburgh took over as a head coach at Kelso from 2015. The captain for 2016–17 season was Dom Buckley.

After dropping down to the third tier in 2016, the team secured immediate promotion back to Scottish National League Division One for the following season with a second-place finish. The history is not without controversy.

== Kelso Sevens ==
Kelso RFC hosts their rugby sevens tournament, the Kelso Sevens. It takes place annually in May (until recently Kelso along with Selkirk RFC held their 7s competition in August) and the competition is part of the Kings of the Sevens tournament. The most recent winners of the trophy (2018) are Melrose RFC.

== Honours ==
- Scottish Premiership
  - Champions (2): 1987–88, 1988–89
- Scottish Cup
  - Runners-Up: (2) 1997–98, 1998–99
- Kelso Sevens
  - Champions (19): 1926, 1927, 1928, 1930, 1936, 1948, 1973, 1981, 1982, 1983, 1986, 1987, 1989, 1995, 1997, 1999, 2001, 2008, 2025
- Melrose Sevens
  - Champions (7): 1978, 1980, 1984, 1985, 1986, 1988, 1989
- Langholm Sevens
  - Champions (9): 1930, 1931, 1934, 1974, 1981, 1997, 1998, 2010, 2025
- Hawick Sevens
  - Champions (6): 1928, 1960, 1973, 1981, 1985, 1997
- Gala Sevens
  - Champions (9): 1925, 1936, 1937, 1941, 1948, 1974, 1983, 1985, 2001, 2023
- Berwick Sevens
  - Champions (4): 1983, 1984, 1985, 2008
- Jed-Forest Sevens
  - Champions (14): 1913, 1914, 1926, 1978, 1979, 1982, 1983, 1984, 1986, 1990, 1995, 1996, 1997, 1998
- Earlston Sevens
  - Champions (13): 1934, 1936, 1937, 1947, 1955, 1958, 1973, 1974, 1978, 1981, 1984, 1997, 1998
- Selkirk Sevens
  - Champions (14): 1928, 1929, 1934, 1936, 1948, 1955, 1973, 1974, 1978, 1979, 1980, 1983, 1984, 1997
- Kings of the Sevens
  - Champions (3): 1996, 1997, 1998
- Kilmarnock Sevens
  - Champions (1): 1980
- Newton Stewart Sevens
  - Champions (1): 2011
- Walkerburn Sevens
  - Champions (1): 2025

== Notable players ==
- Gary Callander
- Gordon Cottington
- George Fairbairn, who later went to rugby league.
- Ross Ford
- John Jeffrey
- Andrew Ker
- Scott Newlands
- Alan Tait, who crossed over to rugby league, and came back again.
- George 'Happy' Wilson, who later went to rugby league.
- Iain Fairley
- Adam Roxburgh
- Roger Baird
- Ken Smith
- Oliver Turnbull
- Bob Grieve
- Laurie Gloag
