= Gala Sevens =

Annual Scottish rugby sevens event

- Sport: Rugby sevens
- Instituted: 1884
- Number of teams: 12
- Country: Scotland
- Holders: (Scotland) Edinburgh Academicals (2019)
- Most titles: (Scotland) Hawick (42 titles)
- Related competition: Kings of the Sevens

Gala Sevens is an annual rugby sevens event held by Gala RFC, in Galashiels, Scotland. The Gala Sevens was the second of the Border Sevens tournaments to be instated in 1884, just behind the Melrose Sevens in 1883.

Held around the start of every April, the tournament is part of the Kings of the Sevens competition. 2019's Gala Sevens took place on the 6 April. It was won by Edinburgh Academicals.

== Sports Day ==
Gala introduced a Sports Day in 1884. This contained rugby sevens, a kicking competition and athletics.

== Memorial Football trophy ==
The winner of the Gala Sevens receives the Border Memorial Football Trophy.

== Invited Sides ==
Various sides have been invited to play in the Gala Sevens tournament throughout the years. The Barbarians entered in a side in 1976, as did Harlequins. Newcastle Falcons reached the final in 1999; Llanelli RFC reached the final in 1970; Bridgend RFC reached the final in 1971.

The Fiji national rugby sevens team won the event in 1991. They beat the Canada national rugby sevens team in the final.

Cardiff RFC won the event in 1964 and were runners-up the following year.

Of the English sides so far invited, only Tynedale, Blackheath, Loughborough Colleges, Orrell and Richmond have won the Memorial Football Trophy.

== Sponsorship ==
The Sevens tournament is usually sponsored by Five Star Taxis of Galashiels.

== Past winners ==
- 2022 (Scotland) Gala
- 2021 (Scotland) Melrose
- 2020 no tournament - coronavirus pandemic
- 2019 (Scotland) Edinburgh Accies
- 2018 (Scotland) Jed-Forest
- 2017 (Scotland) Watsonians
- 2016 (Scotland) Watsonians
- 2015 (Scotland) Gala
- 2014 (Scotland) Melrose
- 2013 (Scotland) Gala
- 2012 (Scotland) Jed-Forest
- 2011 (Scotland) Melrose
- 2010 (Scotland) Melrose
- 2009 (Scotland) Selkirk
- 2008 (Scotland) Heriots
- 2007 (Scotland) Hawick
- 2006 (Scotland) Boroughmuir
- 2005 (Scotland) Watsonians
- 2004 (Scotland) Royal Scots
- 2003 (Scotland) Watsonians
- 2002 (Scotland) Royal Scots
- 2001 (Scotland) Kelso
- 2000 (Scotland) Melrose
- 1999 (Scotland) Melrose
- 1998 (Scotland) Glasgow Hawks
- 1997 (Scotland) Watsonians
- 1996 (Scotland) Watsonians
- 1995 (Scotland) Gala
- 1994 (Scotland) Gala
- 1993 (Scotland) Gala
- 1992 (Scotland) Hawick
- 1991 Fiji
- 1990 (Scotland) Saltires
- 1989 (Scotland) Saltires
- 1988 (Scotland) Saltires
- 1987 (Scotland) Melrose
- 1986 (Scotland) Hawick
- 1985 (Scotland) Kelso
- 1984 (England) Richmond
- 1983 (Scotland) Kelso
- 1982 (Scotland) Gala
- 1981 (Scotland) Kelso
- 1980 (Scotland) Stewarts Melville
- 1979 (Scotland) Hawick
- 1978 (Scotland) Hawick
- 1977 (Scotland) Gala
- 1976 (Scotland) Stewarts Melville
- 1975 (England) Orrell
- 1974 (Scotland) Kelso
- 1973 (Scotland) Heriots
- 1972 (Scotland) Gala
- 1971 (Scotland) Gala
- 1970 (Scotland) Gala
- 1969 (Scotland) Gala
- 1968 (Scotland) Hawick
- 1967 (Scotland) Hawick
- 1966 (Scotland) Hawick
- 1965 (England) Loughborough Colleges
- 1964 (Wales) Cardiff
- 1963 (Scotland) Gala
- 1962 (Scotland) Melrose
- 1961 (Scotland) Hawick
- 1960 (Scotland) Hawick
- 1959 (Scotland) Hawick
- 1958 (Scotland) Hawick
- 1957 (England) Blackheath
- 1956 (Scotland) Hawick
- 1955 (Scotland) Langholm
- 1954 (Scotland) Gala
- 1953 (Scotland) Melrose
- 1952 (Scotland) Stewart's College FP
- 1951 (Scotland) Langholm
- 1950 (Scotland) Glasgow HSFP
- 1949 (Scotland) Hawick
- 1948 (Scotland) Kelso
- 1947 (Scotland) Hawick
- 1946 (Scotland) Hawick
- 1942-1945 Second World War
- 1941 (Scotland) Kelso
- 1940 (Scotland) Hawick
- 1939 (Scotland) Glasgow Academicals
- 1938 (Scotland) Melrose
- 1937 (Scotland) Kelso
- 1936 (Scotland) Kelso
- 1935 (Scotland) Hawick
- 1934 (Scotland) Gala
- 1933 (Scotland) Hawick
- 1932 (Scotland) Hawick
- 1931 (Scotland) Hawick
- 1930 (Scotland) Gala
- 1929 (Scotland) Gala
- 1928 (Scotland) Hawick
- 1927 (Scotland) Hawick
- 1926 (Scotland) Hawick
- 1925 (Scotland) Kelso
- 1924 (Scotland) Hawick
- 1923 (Scotland) Hawick
- 1922 (Scotland) Gala
- 1921 (Scotland) Jed-Forest
- 1920 (Scotland) Gala
- 1919 (Scotland) Royal HSFP
- 1917-1918 First World War
- 1916 (Scotland) 4th K.O.S.Borderers
- 1915 First World War
- 1914 (Scotland) Gala
- 1913 (Scotland) Gala
- 1912 (Scotland) Hawick
- 1911 (Scotland) Hawick
- 1910 (Scotland) Hawick
- 1909 (Scotland) Hawick
- 1908 (Scotland) Gala
- 1907 (Scotland) Gala
- 1906 (Scotland) Hawick
- 1905 (Scotland) Watsonians
- 1904 (Scotland) Hawick
- 1903 (Scotland) Hawick
- 1902 (Scotland) Hawick
- 1901 (Scotland) Hawick
- 1900 (Scotland) Hawick
- 1899 (Scotland) Jed-Forest
- 1898 (Scotland) Hawick
- 1897 (Scotland) Hawick
- 1896 (Scotland) Hawick
- 1895 (Scotland) Hawick
- 1894 (Scotland) Hawick
- 1893 (Scotland) Hawick
- 1892 (Scotland) Jed-Forest
- 1891 (Scotland) Gala
- 1890 (Scotland) Gala
- 1889 (Scotland) Melrose
- 1888 (Scotland) Gala
- 1887 (Scotland) Gala
- 1886 (Scotland) Melrose
- 1885 (England) Tynedale
- 1884 (Scotland) Gala

== See also ==
- Gala RFC
- Borders Sevens Circuit
- Scottish Rugby Union
