= Co-Optimist Rugby Club =

Scottish invitational rugby union team

- Nickname: Co-Ops
- Founded: 1924; 102 years ago
Team kit

Official website
- www.co-optimistrugbyclub.co.uk

The Co-Optimist Rugby Club is an invitational rugby union club founded in 1924 by Jock Wemyss, the former Scottish test player, together with George St Claire Murray, a rugby enthusiast from the Watsonians club.

The Co-Optimists have played against national fifteen-a-side teams including France, Ireland and Zimbabwe in the 1980s. The club also has a notable history at the Hong Kong Sevens tournament, finishing as runner-up to Fiji in 1980, as a semi-finalist against Australia in 1981, and a quarter-finalist in 1986.

== Club colours and emblem ==
The club colours are a navy blue jersey with white shorts and navy and white hooped socks. The Co-Optimist badge is a lion couchant in blue on a white background.

== Notable players ==
Many well-known international players have represented the club including: Finlay Calder, Jonathan Davies, Mike Gibson, Gavin Hastings, Scott Hastings, Andy Irvine, Dickie Jeeps, John Jeffrey, Tom Kiernan, Ian McGeechan, Doddie Weir, Tony O'Reilly and Rob Wainwright.

== Partial list of games played against international opposition ==
=== XVs ===
Year	Date	Opponent	Venue	Result	Score	Tour
1979	14 October	(South Africa) South African Barbarians	Mansfield Park, Hawick	Win	24 - 4	Report
1989	6 April	(Soviet Union) Soviet Students	Meggetland Sports Complex, Edinburgh	Win	17 - 15	Report

=== Sevens ===
Year	Date	Opponent	Venue	Result	Score	Tour
1980	12 April	Canada 7s	Hong Kong	Win		
1980	12 April	Australia 7s	Hong Kong	Win		
1980	13 April	New Zealand 7s	Hong Kong	Win		
1980	13 April	Fiji 7s	Hong Kong	Loss	8 - 12	Report
1981	28 March	Indonesia 7s	Hong Kong	Win	22 - 6	Report
1981	28 March	Singapore 7s	Hong Kong	Win	22 - 4	Report
1981	29 March	Australia 7s	Hong Kong	Loss	10 - 18	Report
1986	5 April	Papua New Guinea 7s	Hong Kong	Win	26 - 0	Report
1986	5 April	Canada 7s	Hong Kong	Win	14 - 8	Report
1986	6 April	(France) French Barbarians	Hong Kong	Loss	10 - 22	Report

== Honours ==
- Melrose Sevens
  - Champions (1): 1993
- Langholm Sevens
  - Champions (1): 1936
- Jed-Forest Sevens
  - Champions (1): 1940
- Selkirk Sevens
  - Champions (4): 1937, 1938, 1947, 1975
- Edinburgh Charity Sevens
  - Champions (2): 1939, 1960
- Edinburgh Borderers Sevens
  - Champions (1): 1925
- Glasgow High Kelvinside Sevens
  - Champions (1): 1984
