= Borders Sevens Circuit =

Series of rugby tournaments in Scotland

The Borders Sevens Circuit is a series of rugby sevens tournaments held annually in the Scottish Borders. Originally the circuit consisted of 5 tournaments; Langholm Sevens being the last added in 1908. It is the oldest Sevens circuit in the world; the first Sevens tournament outside Scotland - bar two single Sevens matches in Chorley, England in 1888 and 1889 - was held in the Scottish expatriate city of Dunedin in New Zealand in 1889 and there was no other Sevens tournament clusters elsewhere.

The main circuit has now grown to 11 tournaments; 10 in Scotland and 1 - the Berwick Sevens - in England.

The circuit has now extended into a league known as Kings of the Sevens. Of the extended circuit only the Walkerburn Sevens is not included in this league. The Kings of the Sevens championship is run by the Border League.

== History ==
The original Borders Sevens Circuit consisted of the Melrose Sevens (founded 1883), Gala Sevens (1884), Hawick Sevens (1886), Jed-Forest Sevens (1894) and Langholm Sevens (1908). This was known as the Spring Circuit.

Walkerburn Sevens started in 1911. It is traditionally the last tournament of the Sevens season and is instead treated as a finale.

Other Sevens tournaments were added to the calendar after the First World War:- Selkirk Sevens (1919); Kelso Sevens (1920), Peebles Sevens (1923) and Earlston Sevens (1923). These were originally pre-season tournaments.

The last tournament added to the Borders Sevens Circuit was the Berwick Sevens in 1983.

=== Schedule ===
Traditional Sevens schedule was changed by the Scottish Rugby Union in order to allow more time for the regular rugby season. Controversially, due to the influence of former national coach Jim Telfer, Melrose RFC did not have to change its date. As of 2011, Sevens will take place on consecutive weekends in April and May. The schedule is due to change again for season 2019–20.

=== Invited sides ===
Each of the Sevens tournaments has a history of invited sides. Melrose Sevens - the World's most prestigious Sevens tournament - as it was the birthplace of the sport - notably has the most; attracting teams globally. The likes of the French Barbarians (1983); Ireland Wolfhounds (1991); Bay of Plenty (1992); Manly (1995); Hamilton RFC, Sea Point (2010) and Saracens (2012, 2013) have all won the event.

Outwith the Melrose tournament the likes of London Welsh won Hawick Sevens in 1969; London Scottish won the Kelso Sevens in 1991; Newcastle Falcons won Langholm Sevens between 2005 and 2008; the Barbarians and Harlequins entered the Gala Sevens in 1976; and Northampton Saints have won the Selkirk Sevens in 1991 and 1993.

==== International 7s sides ====
International 7s sides often take part amongst the club sides. Fiji 7s beat Canada 7s in the 1991 Gala Sevens final. Scotland 7s won the final of the Kelso Sevens in 1996 beating Kenya 7s; and Scotland 7s won the Selkirk Sevens in 1996 beating the Wales 7s side in the final. Germany 7s reached the final of the Melrose Sevens in 2015, losing out to Glasgow Warriors. The Belgium 7s reached the quarter-finals of the Melrose Sevens in 2022, losing out to the hosts.

== Main circuit ==
The new circuit has thus been extended from the original 5 tournaments in Spring. The Borders Sevens circuit now contains 11 tournaments:-

- Peebles Sevens
- Gala Sevens
- Melrose Sevens
- Hawick Sevens
- Berwick Sevens
- Langholm Sevens
- Kelso Sevens
- Earlston Sevens
- Selkirk Sevens
- Jed-Forest Sevens
- Walkerburn Sevens

=== Other Sevens tournaments in the Borders ===
Other Sevens tournaments in the Borders are:-

- Hawick Linden Sevens
- South of Scotland District used to run a Sevens tournament.

== Kings of the Sevens ==
The ten most prestigious of the main circuit tournaments make up a league competition known as the Kings of the Sevens. The league began in 1994 though work is ongoing to calculate previous winners based on the format.

The ten tournaments used for the Kings of the Sevens league are:-

- Peebles Sevens
- Gala Sevens
- Melrose Sevens
- Hawick Sevens
- Berwick Sevens
- Langholm Sevens
- Kelso Sevens
- Earlston Sevens
- Selkirk Sevens
- Jed-Forest Sevens

The Walkerburn Sevens are instead known as the Prince of the Sevens and remain the season finale.

=== Format ===
Teams competing gain points depending on how far they progress in each tournament; the winner gains ten points, the runner up gets seven points, and semi-finalists receive five points. Teams that are eliminated at the quarter-final stage gain three points.

The Kings of the Sevens champions are thus the team that has performed the best across all ten tournaments.

=== Kings of the Sevens champions ===
- 2025 (Scotland) Kelso (4)
- 2019 (Scotland) Watsonians (4)
- 2018 (Scotland) Watsonians (3)
- 2017 (Scotland) Watsonians (2)
- 2016 (Scotland) Jed-Forest (5)
- 2015 (Scotland) Gala (4)
- 2014 (Scotland) Melrose (8)
- 2013 (Scotland) Melrose (7)
- 2012 (Scotland) Jed-Forest (4)
- 2011 (Scotland) Melrose (6)
- 2010 (Scotland) Melrose (5)
- 2009 (Scotland) Watsonians (1)
- 2008 (Scotland) Selkirk (2)
- 2007 (Scotland) Selkirk (1)
- 2006 (Scotland) Jed-Forest (3)
- 2005 (Scotland) Melrose (4)
- 2004 (Scotland) Gala (3)
- 2003 (Scotland) Jed-Forest (2)
- 2002 (Scotland) Melrose (3)
- 2001 (Scotland) Jed-Forest (1)
- 2000 (Scotland) Melrose (2)
- 1999 (Scotland) Melrose (1)
- 1998 (Scotland) Kelso (3)
- 1997 (Scotland) Kelso (2)
- 1996 (Scotland) Kelso (1)
- 1995 (Scotland) Gala (2)
- 1994 (Scotland) Gala (1)

== See also ==
- Scottish Rugby Union
- Scottish Premiership
