= Melrose Sevens =

Scottish annual rugby sevens event

- Sport: Rugby sevens
- Instituted: 1883; 143 years ago
- Number of teams: 24
- Country: Scotland
- Holders: (Hong Kong) Shogun (2024)
- Most titles: (Scotland) Hawick (28 titles)
- Website: melrose7s.co.uk
- Broadcast partner: BBC Scotland
- Related competition: Kings of the Sevens

Melrose Sevens is an annual rugby sevens event held by Melrose Rugby Club, at The Greenyards in Melrose, Scotland. It is the oldest rugby sevens competition in the world, dating back to 1883 when the tournament was suggested by former Melrose players Ned Haig and Davie Sanderson. Shogun are the current men and women's holders having won the tournament in 2024.

== History ==
Held every April, the tournament is part of the Kings of the Sevens competition, and has attracted teams from as far afield as Japan, Hong Kong, Uruguay and South Africa.

From 2018 the playing time in the final was cut from twenty minutes to fourteen minutes which is in line with the standard match time.

In September 2019 the organisers had set out plans for the Melrose Sevens to relaunch as a four-day festival of music and rugby. The 2020 event was however postponed and eventually cancelled due to the coronavirus pandemic. There was no event held in 2021 due to the pandemic.

== Media coverage ==
Domestically, the tournament is broadcast live on YouTube and locally, from the first tie right through to the final, on Borders Rugby Radio

== Past winners ==
- 2024 (Hong Kong) Shogun (Men's and Women's)
- 2023 Monaco IMPI's
- 2023 (England) Lionesses (Women's)
- 2022 (United Kingdom) British Army
- 2020-2021 Not held due to COVID-19 pandemic
- 2019 (England) London Scottish
- 2018 (Scotland) Watsonians
- 2017 (England) Harlequins
- 2016 (Scotland) Edinburgh
- 2015 (Scotland) Glasgow Warriors
- 2014 (Scotland) Glasgow Warriors
- 2013 (England) Saracens
- 2012 (England) Saracens
- 2011 (Scotland) Melrose
- 2010 (South Africa) Hamilton Sea Point
- 2009 (South Africa) University of Johannesburg
- 2008 (Scotland) Scottish Thistles
- 2007 (South Africa) University of the Free State
- 2006 (England) Newcastle Falcons
- 2005 (South Africa) Stellenbosch University
- 2004 (South Africa) Stellenbosch University
- 2003 (England) Sale Sharks
- 2002 (Scotland) Boroughmuir
- 2001 (British & Irish Lions) Barbarians
- 2000 (Fiji) Nawaka
- 1999 (Scotland) Gala
- 1998 (Scotland) Melrose
- 1997 (Scotland) Melrose
- 1996 (Scotland) Watsonians
- 1995 (Australia) Manly
- 1994 (Scotland) Gala
- 1993 Co-Optimists
- 1992 (New Zealand) Bay of Plenty
- 1991 (Ireland) Irish Wolfhounds
- 1990 (Australia) Randwick
- 1989 (Scotland) Kelso
- 1988 (Scotland) Kelso
- 1987 (England) Harlequins
- 1986 (Scotland) Kelso
- 1985 (Scotland) Kelso
- 1984 (Scotland) Kelso
- 1983 (France) French Barbarians
- 1982 (Scotland) Heriot's FP
- 1981 (Scotland) Gala
- 1980 (Scotland) Kelso
- 1979 (Scotland) Stewart's Melville
- 1978 (Scotland) Kelso
- 1977 (Scotland) Gala
- 1976 (Scotland) Watsonians
- 1975 (Scotland) Melrose
- 1974 (Scotland) Jed-Forest
- 1973 (Scotland) Edinburgh Wanderers
- 1972 (Scotland) Gala
- 1971 (Scotland) Gala
- 1970 (Scotland) Gala
- 1969 (England) Loughborough Colleges
- 1968 (England) Loughborough Colleges
- 1967 (Scotland) Hawick
- 1966 (Scotland) Hawick
- 1965 (England) London Scottish
- 1964 (Scotland) Gala
- 1963 (Scotland) Boroughmuir
- 1962 (England) London Scottish
- 1961 (Scotland) Royal HSFP
- 1960 (England) Cambridge University
- 1959 (Scotland) Gala
- 1958 (Scotland) Heriot's FP
- 1957 (Scotland) Heriot's FP
- 1956 (Scotland) Stewart's College FP
- 1955 (Scotland) Hawick
- 1954 (Scotland) Heriot's FP
- 1953 (Scotland) Hawick
- 1952 (Scotland) Melrose
- 1951 (England) Rosslyn Park
- 1950 (Scotland) Melrose
- 1949 (Scotland) Edinburgh Accies
- 1948 (Scotland) Melrose
- 1947 (Scotland) Melrose
- 1946 (Scotland) Hawick
- 1945 (Scotland) Watsonians
- 1942-1944 Not held due to World War II
- 1941 (Scotland) Edinburgh City Police
- 1940 (Scotland) Heriot's FP
- 1939 (Scotland) Heriot's FP
- 1938 (Scotland) Heriot's FP
- 1937 (Scotland) Gala
- 1936 (Scotland) Watsonians
- 1935 (Scotland) Watsonians
- 1934 (Scotland) Royal HSFP
- 1933 (Scotland) Hawick
- 1932 (Scotland) Gala
- 1931 (Scotland) Melrose
- 1930 (Scotland) Edinburgh Accies
- 1929 (Scotland) Hawick
- 1928 (Scotland) Edinburgh Accies
- 1927 (Scotland) Hawick
- 1926 (Scotland) Watsonians
- 1925 (Scotland) Hawick
- 1924 (Scotland) Hawick
- 1923 (Scotland) Heriot's FP
- 1922 (Scotland) Hawick
- 1921 (Scotland) Royal HSFP
- 1920 (Scotland) Stewart's College FP
- 1919 (Scotland) Hawick
- 1916-1918 Not held due to World War I
- 1915 (Scotland) Lothian & Border Horse
- 1914 (Scotland) Watsonians
- 1913 (Scotland) Hawick
- 1912 (Scotland) Hawick
- 1911 (Scotland) Hawick
- 1910 (Scotland) Hawick
- 1909 (Scotland) Hawick
- 1908 (Scotland) Hawick
- 1907 (Scotland) Watsonians
- 1906 (Scotland) Watsonians
- 1905 (Scotland) Watsonians
- 1904 (Scotland) Jed-Forest
- 1903 (Scotland) Gala
- 1902 (Scotland) Jed-Forest
- 1901 (Scotland) Hawick
- 1900 (Scotland) Hawick
- 1899 (Scotland) Jed-Forest
- 1898 (Scotland) Hawick
- 1897 (Scotland) Hawick
- 1896 (Scotland) Hawick
- 1895 (Scotland) Hawick
- 1894 (Scotland) Hawick
- 1893 (Scotland) Hawick
- 1892 (Scotland) Hawick
- 1891 (Scotland) Gala
- 1890 (Scotland) Gala
- 1889 (Scotland) Melrose
- 1888 (Scotland) Hawick & Wilton
- 1887 (Scotland) Hawick
- 1886 (England) Tynedale
- 1885 (Scotland) Melrose
- 1884 (Scotland) Gala
- 1883 (Scotland) Melrose

== Number of wins ==
- Hawick (28)
- Gala (15)
- Melrose (12)
- Watsonians (10)
- Kelso (7)
- Heriot's FP (7)
- Jed-Forest (4)
- Boroughmuir (3)
- Edinburgh Accies (3)
- (England) London Scottish (3)
- Royal HSFP (3)
- Stewart's College FP (2)
- (South Africa) Stellenbosch University (2)
- (England) Loughborough Colleges (2)
- (England) Harlequins (2)
- (England) Saracens (2)
- Glasgow Warriors (2)

== See also ==
- Melrose RFC
- Borders Sevens Circuit
- Scottish Rugby Union
