= William Hunter =

William Hunter may refer to:

== Politicians ==
=== U.S. politicians ===
- William Hunter (Vermont politician) (1754–1827), U.S. representative from Vermont
- William Hunter (senator) (1774–1849), U.S. senator from Rhode Island
- William H. Hunter (died 1842), U.S. representative from Ohio
- William Hunter (assistant secretary of state) (1805–1886), U.S. assistant secretary of state; Rhode Island politician
- William F. Hunter (1808–1874), lawyer and U.S. representative from Ohio

=== Other politicians ===
- William Hunter (Aberdeen MP) (1844–1898), Scottish politician
- William Hunter, Lord Hunter (1865–1957), Scottish politician and judge
- William Hunter (Canadian politician) (1858–1939), businessman and politician in British Columbia

== Sports ==
- Will Hunter (born 1979), American football safety
- William Hunter (American athlete) (1883–1966), American Olympic athlete
- William Hunter (British athlete) (1892–1974), British Olympic athlete
- William Hunter (footballer, born 1887) (1887–1949), English footballer
- William Hunter (golfer) (c. 1850–?), Scottish amateur golfer
- Willie Hunter (American football), American football player and coach
- Willie Hunter (footballer, born 1940) (1940–2020), Scottish football player and manager
- Willie Hunter (footballer, born 1880) (fl. 1900s), Scottish footballer
- Willie Hunter (golfer) (1892–1968), Scottish-American professional golfer
- Bill Hunter (catcher) (William F. Hunter, 1855–1918), baseball catcher
- Bill Hunter (outfielder) (William Ellsworth Hunter, 1887–1934), American baseball player
- Bill Hunter (footballer, born 1900) (William Hunter), Scottish football defender
- Billy Hunter (footballer) (William Hunter, 1885–1937), Scottish professional football player and manager
- Bill Hunter (ice hockey) (William Dickenson Hunter, 1920–2002), Canadian hockey owner, general manager, coach
- Bill Hunter (New Zealand footballer) (William Hunter), New Zealand international football (soccer) player
- Billy Hunter (rugby union) (William John Ferguson Hunter, 1934–2016), Scotland international rugby union player

== Other people ==
- William Hunter (merchant), 16th-century Scottish merchant and spy
- William Hunter (anatomist) (1718–1783), Scottish anatomist
- William Hunter (surgeon) (1861–1937), British surgeon known for his oral sepsis theory
- William Hunter (Asiatic Society) (1755–1812), official and minister in India
- William Hunter (martyr) (c. 1530–1555), Protestant martyr
- Joseph Bradford (playwright) (William Randolph Hunter, 1843–1886), American playwright
- William Wilson Hunter (1840–1900), British historian
- William Hunter (statistician) (1937–1986), statistician
- William Guyer Hunter (1829–1902), surgeon-general in India, principal of medical colleges and Conservative politician
- William Hunter (publisher) (died 1761), printer and publisher in colonial America
- William Magee Hunter (1834–1868), New Zealand soldier
- Willie Hunter (musician) (1933–1995), Scottish folk fiddler
- Bill Hunter (journalist) (William Bradley Hunter, 1928–1964), American crime reporter
- Bill Hunter (actor) (William John Hunter, 1940–2011), Australian actor
- Bill Hunter (businessman) (William Hunter, 1938–2023), Scottish businessman

== See also ==
- Bill Hunter (disambiguation)
