= Bill Hunter =

Bill Hunter or Billy Hunter may refer to:

== Sports figures ==
=== American ===
- Bill Hunter (catcher) (1855–1918), baseball catcher
- Bill Hunter (outfielder) (1887–1934), American baseball player
- Billy Hunter (basketball) (born 1942), former National Basketball Players Association executive
- Billy Hunter (baseball) (1928–2025), MLB All-Star shortstop and manager

=== Scottish ===
- Bill Hunter (footballer, born 1900), Scottish football defender
- Billy Hunter (footballer) (1885–1937), Scottish professional football player and manager
- Billy Hunter (rugby union) (1934–2016), Scotland international rugby union player

=== Other ===
- Bill Hunter (ice hockey) (1920–2002), Canadian hockey owner, general manager, coach
- Bill Hunter (New Zealand footballer), New Zealand international football (soccer) player

== Other people ==
- Bill Hunter (politician) (1920–2015), Trotskyist leader in Britain and an International Socialist League member
- Bill Hunter (journalist) (1928–1964), American crime reporter
- Bill Hunter (businessman) (1938–2023), Scottish businessman
- Bill Hunter (actor) (1940–2011), Australian actor

== See also ==
- William Hunter (disambiguation)
