= 1962–63 Scottish Inter-District Championship =

Rugby union competition

- Countries: Scotland
- Date: 1962–63
- Champions: Edinburgh
- Runners-up: South
- Matches played: 6

The 1962–63 Scottish Inter-District Championship was a rugby union competition for Scotland's district teams.

This season saw the tenth formal Scottish Inter-District Championship.

Edinburgh District won the competition with 3 wins.

== 1962-63 League Table ==
| Team | P | W | D | L | PF | PA | +/- | Pts |
|---|---|---|---|---|---|---|---|---|
| Edinburgh District | 3 | 3 | 0 | 0 | 38 | 9 | +29 | 6 |
| South | 3 | 2 | 0 | 1 | 32 | 19 | +13 | 4 |
| Glasgow District | 3 | 1 | 0 | 2 | 18 | 20 | -2 | 2 |
| North and Midlands | 3 | 0 | 0 | 3 | 9 | 49 | -40 | 0 |

== Results ==
| Date | Try | Conversion | Penalty | Dropped goal | Goal from mark | Notes |
|---|---|---|---|---|---|---|
| 1948–1970 | 3 points | 2 points | 3 points | 3 points | 3 points | |

=== Round 1 ===
24 October 1962

| South | 6 – 0 | Glasgow District |
| Try: Oliver Grant; Hollands | Report |

Poynder Park, Kelso
Referee: J. R. Hunter (Stewart's College F.P.)

South: J.H. Gray (Hawick), Christy Elliot (Langholm), A. W. Ford (Kelso), George Stevenson (Hawick) [captain], W. Hollands (Gala), A. R. Broatch (Hawick), R. G. Turnbull (Hawick), Norm Suddon (Hawick), Frank Laidlaw (Melrose), G. H. Willison (Hawick), Jim Telfer (Melrose), Billy Hunter (Hawick), Rob Valentine (Hawick), Oliver Grant (Hawick), Charlie Stewart (Kelso)
Glasgow District: A. T. Henderson (Hutchesons' GSFP), G. R. Greig (Glasgow HSFP), D. A. C. Montgomery (Glasgow Academicals), G. M. Simmers (Glasgow Academicals) [captain], P. M. Connelly (Jordanhill), Brian Simmers (Glasgow Academicals), A. E. C. Little (Glasgow HSFP), I. G. C. McLaren (Glasgow HSFP), I. G. Thomson (West of Scotland), T. E. R. Young (West of Scotland), A. J. McKellar (West of Scotland), Hamish Kemp (Glasgow HSFP), A. D. Innes (Glasgow Academicals), Peter Brown (West of Scotland), J. Buchanan (Jordanhill)

=== Round 2 ===
3 November 1962

| North and Midlands | 3 – 20 | South |
| Drop: J. R. Clarke | Preview; Report | Try: David Chisholm; George Stevenson; W. Hollands; Oliver Grant; Con: David Chisholm x 4 |

McKane Park, Dunfermline
Referee: D. McIntyre (Glasgow HSFP)

North and Midlands: C. C. McLeod (Madras College F.P), A. N. Cook (Gordonians), L. R. Macdonald (Aberdeen GSFP), B. W. Brown (St. Andrews University), A. Bryce (Dunfermline), J. R. Clarke (Perthshire Academicals), Ian McCrae (Gordonians), David Rollo (Howe of Fife), A. G. D. Whyte (Gordonians), I. C. Spence (Gordonians), J. Beveridge (Dunfermline), E. Brocklebank (Madras College F.P.), J. B. Steven (Madras College F.P.) [captain], J. N. Smith (Perthshire Academicals), C. E. S. Burnett (Panmure)
South: J.H. Gray (Hawick), Christy Elliot (Langholm), George Stevenson (Hawick) [captain], A. R. Broatch (Hawick), W. Hollands (Gala), David Chisholm (Melrose), Alex Hastie (Melrose), Norm Suddon (Hawick), Frank Laidlaw (Melrose), G. H. Willison (Hawick), Billy Hunter (Hawick), Jim Telfer (Melrose), Rob Valentine (Hawick), Oliver Grant (Hawick), D. M. Brown (Melrose)

=== Round 3 ===
17 November 1962

| North and Midlands | 3 – 11 | Edinburgh District |
| Try: Ian McCrae | Report | Try: Burnet; Hinshelwood; Robertson; Con: Colin Blaikie |

Duffus Park, Cupar
Referee: J. Imrie (Hawick)

North and Midlands: B. W. A. Mitchell (Perthshire Academicals), A. N. Cook (Gordonians), C. C. McLeod (Madras College F. P.), B. W. Brown (St. Andrews University), A. Byrce (Dunfermline), J. R. Clarke (Perthshire Academicals), Ian McCrae (Gordonians), G. P. Hill (Gordonians), A. G. D. Whyte (Gordonians), I. C. Spence (Gordonians), J. Beveridge (Dunfermline), A. R. Porteous (Perthshire Academicals), J. B. Steven (Madras College F. P.) [captain], D. G. M. Mowat (Perthshire Academicals), R. J. C. Glasgow (Dunfermline)
Edinburgh District: Colin Blaikie (Heriots F.P), A. J. W. Hinshelwood (Stewart's College F. P.), B. C. Henderson (Edinburgh Wanderers), P. J. Burnet (Edinburgh Academicals), W. S. Robertson (Edinburgh Wanderers), J. Black (Royal HSFP), G. F. Goddard (Heriots F.P.), J. Steven (Edinburgh Wanderers), G. I. Grahamsaw (Royal HSFP), J. B. Neill (Edinburgh Academicals), J. Douglas (Stewart's College F. P.), J. K. Millar (Edinburgh Academicals), I. P. Fisher (Royal HSFP), A. C. McNish (Watsonians), K. I. Ross (Boroughmuir F. P.)

=== Round 4 ===
1 December 1962

| Glasgow District | 0 – 11 | Edinburgh District |
| | Report | Try: Jardine; Con: Colin Blaikie; Pen: Coughtrie; Colin Blaikie |

Hughenden Stadium
Referee: R. P. Burrell (Gala)

Glasgow District: A. T. Henderson (Hutchesons' GSFP), G. R. Greig (Glasgow HSFP), D. A. C. Montgomery (Glasgow Academicals), G. M. Simmers (Glasgow Academicals) [captain], I. F. Docherty (Glasgow HSFP), Brian Simmers (Glasgow Academicals), A. E. C. Little (Glasgow HSFP), I. G. C. McLaren (Glasgow HSFP), I. G. Thomson (West of Scotland), T. E. R. Young (West of Scotland), A. J. McKellar (West of Scotland), J. S. Couper (Glasgow HSFP), W. Davies (Glasgow University), A. D. Innes (Glasgow Academicals), J. Buchanan (Jordanhill)
Edinburgh District: Colin Blaikie (Heriots F.P), J. D. Jardine (Edinburgh Academicals), B. C. Henderson (Edinburgh Wanderers), P. J. Burnet (Edinburgh Academicals), W. S. Robertson (Edinburgh Wanderers), J. Blake (Royal HSFP), S. Coughtrie (Edinburgh Academicals) [captain], John Steven (Edinburgh Wanderers), J. R. Taylor (Trinity Academicals), J. B. Neill (Edinburgh Academicals), J. L. Gormley (Boroughmuir F.P.), J. K. Millar (Edinburgh Academicals), J. P. Fisher (Royal HSFP), A. C. McNish (Watsonians), K. I. Ross (Boroughmuir F. P.)

=== Round 5 ===
19 January 1963

| Edinburgh District | 16 – 6 | South |
| Try: B. C. Henderson; S. Coughtrie; K. I. Ross; Con: Colin Blaikie x 2 Pen: S. Coughtrie | Report | Try: George Stevenson; Pen: David Chisholm |

Murrayfield Stadium
Referee: G. K. Rome (Glasgow Academicals)

Edinburgh District: Colin Blaikie (Heriots F.P), J. D. Jardine (Edinburgh Academicals), D. L. Lees (Edinburgh Wanderers), B. C. Henderson (Edinburgh Wanderers), W. S. Robertson (Edinburgh Wanderers), J. Blake (Royal HSFP), S. Coughtrie (Edinburgh Academicals) [captain], John Steven (Edinburgh Wanderers), G. I. Grahamslaw (Royal HSFP), J. B. Neill (Edinburgh Academicals), J. K. Millar (Edinburgh Academicals), John Douglas (Stewart's College F.P), J. P. Fisher (Royal HSFP), A. C. McNish (Watsonians), K. I. Ross (Boroughmuir F. P.)
South: J.H. Gray (Hawick), Christy Elliot (Langholm), George Stevenson (Hawick) [captain], A. R. Broatch (Hawick), D. Jackson (Hawick), David Chisholm (Melrose), Alex Hastie (Melrose), Norm Suddon (Hawick), Frank Laidlaw (Melrose), G. H. Willison (Hawick), Jim Telfer (Melrose), Billy Hunter (Hawick), Rob Valentine (Hawick), Oliver Grant (Hawick), D. M. Brown (Melrose)

=== Round 6 ===
2 March 1963

| Glasgow District | 18 – 3 | North and Midlands |
| Try: R. G. McCallum; T. E. R. Young? G. R. Greig; Con: Brian Simmers x 3 Pen: Brian Simmers | Preview; Report | Pen: C. C. McLeod |

Murrayfield Stadium
Referee: T. E. Grierson (Hawick)

Glasgow District: A. T. Henderson (Hutchesons' GSFP), D. A. C. Montgomery (Glasgow Academicals), G. R. Greig (Glasgow HSFP), G. M. Simmers (Glasgow Academicals) [captain], P. M. Connelly (Jordanhill), Brian Simmers (Glasgow Academicals), I. D. Beattie (Jordanhill), I. G. C. McLaren (Glasgow HSFP), I. G. Thomson (West of Scotland), T. E. R. Young (West of Scotland), Hamish Kemp (Glasgow HSFP), A. J. McKellar (West of Scotland), W. Davies (Glasgow University), J. Buchanan (Jordanhill), R. G. McCallum (Greenock Wanderers)
North and Midlands: C. C. McLeod (Madras College F.P) [captain], A. N. Cook (Gordonians), B. W. Brown (St. Andrews University), A. Wilson (Aberdeen University), A. Bryce (Dunfermline), F. N. McKenzie (Aberdeen GSFP), I. G. McCrae (Gordonians), G. P. Mill (Gordonians), A. G. D. Whyte (Gordonians), David Rollo (Howe of Fife), J. Beveridge (Dunfermline), A. R. Porteous (Perthshire Academicals), M. G. Walker (Aberdeen GSFP), D. G. Mowat (Perthshire Academicals), D. A. G. Smith (Perthshire Academicals)

== Matches outwith the Championship ==
=== Other Scottish matches ===
10 October 1962

| Aberdeen University | 0 - 30 | North of Scotland District select |
| | Preview; Preview; Report |

Aberdeen University:
North of Scotland District Select: K. Mulholland (Gordonlans), A. N. Cook (Gordonlans), I. R. Macdonald (Aberdeen GSFP), C. Tennant (Gordonians) S. Keir (Gordonlans), D. Halkerston (Aberdeen Academicals), Ian McCrae (Gordonians), G. P. Hill (Gordonians), A. G. D. Whyte (Gordonians), I. C. Spence (Gordonians) [captain], M. G. H. Gibb (Aberdeen GSFP), R. Taylor (Dounreay), R. Davidson (Aberdeen Academicals), D. W. T. Paul (Aberdeen GSFP), M. G. J. Clark (Gordoninans)

13 October 1962

| Glasgow District | 3 - 19 | Rest of the West |
| | Preview; Result |

Old Anniesland, Glasgow

Glasgow District:
Rest of the West:

20 October 1962

| North of Scotland District | - | Midlands District |
| | Preview |

Linksfield, Aberdeen

North of Scotland District: K. Mulholland (Gordonlans), N. Cook (Gordonlans), I. R. Macdonald (Aberdeen GSFP), A. Wilson (Aberdeen University). S. Keir (Gordonlans), D. Halkerston (Aberdeen Academicals), Ian McCrae (Gordonians), G. P. Hill (Gordonians), A. G. D. Whyte (Gordonians), I. C. Spence (Gordonians), D. M. Henderson (Aberdeen University), G. W. Fraser (Aberdeen GSFP), W. Balfour (Aberdeen GSFP), D. W. T. Paul (Aberdeen GSFP), I. E. Allan (Gordoninans)
Midlands District: C. C. McLeod (Madras College F.P.), A. W. Sinclair (St. Andrews University), D. J. Whyte (St. Andrews University), B. W. Brown (St. Andrews University), A. Bryce (Dunfermline), J. R. Clarke (Perthshire Academicals), E. Duncan (Madras College F.P.), A Pattullo (Panmure), A. J. Nicol (Howe of Fife), D. M. Brien (Perthshire Academicals), J. W. Smith (Perthshire Academicals), J. Beveridge (Dunfermline), J. B. Steven (Madras College F.P.), D. G. M. Mowat (Perthshire Academicals), C. E. Burnett (Panmure)

=== Trial matches ===
15 December 1962

| Blues Trial | 8 - 6 | Whites Trial |
| Try: David Rollo; David Chisholm; Con: K. J. F. Scotland | Preview; Report | Try: J. Blake; K. I. Ross |

Murrayfield Stadium
Referee: H. B. Laidlaw (Hawick)

Blues Trial: K. J. F. Scotland (Leicester), R. H. Thomson (London Scottish), J. J. McPartlin (Oxford University), I. H. P. Laughland (London Scottish), W. S. Robinson (Edinburgh Wanderers), David Chisholm (Melrose), J. A. T. Rodd (London Scottish), David Rollo (Howe of Fife), A. G. D. Whyte (Gordonians), J. B. Neill (Edinburgh Academicals), F. H. ten Bos (London Scottish), Mike Campbell-Lamerton (Halifax), R. J. C. Glasgow (Dunfermline), T. O. Grant (Hawick), R. I. Marshall (London Scottish)
Whites Trial: S. Wilson (St. Peter's Hall, Oxford University), D. M. White (St. John's College, Oxford University), R. E. Leslie (Northampton), G. D. Stevenson (Hawick), Charlie Hodgson (London Scottish), J. Blake (Royal HSFP), S. Coughtrie (Edinburgh Academicals) [captain], A. C. W. Boyle (London Scottish), F. A. L. Laidlaw (Melrose), I. C. Spence (Gordonians), Billy Hunter (Hawick), P. K. Stagg (Oxford University), K. I. Ross (Boroughmuir), J. W. Telfer (Melrose), R. A. W. Watherson (London Scottish)

9 February 1963

| Blues Trial | 23 - 6 | Whites Trial |
| Try: David Rollo; Con: S. Coughtrie; Pen: S. Coughtrie x 5 Drop: K. J. F. Scotland | Preview; Report; Report | Try: Colin Blaikie; Pen: Colin Blaikie |

Murrayfield Stadium
Referee: D. J. C. McMahon (Heriots)

Blues Trial: K. J. F. Scotland (Heriots) [captain], J. A. P. Shackleton (London Scottish), B. C. Henderson (Edinburgh Wanderers), D. M. White (Kelvinside Academicals), G. D. Stevenson (Hawick), J. Blake (Royal HSFP), S. Coughtrie (Edinburgh Academicals), A. C. W. Boyle (London Scottish), N. S. Bruce (London Scottish), David Rollo (Howe of Fife), W. J. Hunter (Hawick), Mike Campbell-Lamerton (Halifax), R. J. C. Glasgow (Dunfermline), W. R. A. Watherston (London Scottish), J. P. Fisher (Royal HSFP)
Whites Trial: Colin Blaikie (Heriots), C. Elliot (Langholm), G. R. Greig (Glasgow HSFP), A. R. Broatch (Hawick), D. J. Whyte (St. Andrews University), R. H. Lamb (Oxford University), Alex Hastie (Melrose), Norm Suddon (Hawick), F. A. L. Laidlaw (Melrose), J. B. Neill (Edinburgh Academicals) [captain], F. H. ten Bos (London Scottish), J. K. Millar (Edinburgh Academicals), J. C. Brash (Middlesbrough), John Douglas (Stewart's College F.P.), K. I. Ross (Boroughmuir) - J. D. Jardine (Edinburgh Academicals) replaced D. J. Whyte after 17 minutes.

2 March 1963

| Blues Trial | 23 - 20 | Whites Trial |
| Try: Davidson | Preview; Report |

Murrayfield Stadium
Referee: J. R. Hunter (Stewart's College F.P.)

Blues Trial: T. L. B. Adam (Edinburgh University), C. Elliot (Langholm), K. A. I. Davidson (Watsonians), Gregor Sharp (Stewart's College F.P.), G. D. Stevenson (Hawick), A. R. Broatch (Hawick), R. G. Turnbull (Hawick), I. C. Spence (Gordonians), ? (Stewart's College F.P), Norm Suddon (Hawick), J. K. Millar (Edinburgh Academicals) Jim Telfer (Melrose), K. I. Ross (Hawick), T. O. Grant (Hawick), J. P. Fisher (Royal HSFP) [captain]
Whites Trial: J. H. Gray (Hawick), J. D. Jardine (Edinburgh Academicals), R. W. Cameron (Royal HSFP), David Chisholm (Melrose), D. Jackson (Hawick), K. J. F. Scotland (Heriots) [captain], S. Coughtrie (Edinburgh Academicals), W. A. M. Crow (Edinburgh Wanderers), Frank Laidlaw (Melrose), J. B. Neill (Edinburgh Academicals), Billy Hunter (Hawick), G. W. S. Mitchell (Edinburgh University), A. Jeffrey (Langholm), John Douglas (Stewart's College F.P), ? (Kelso)

=== English matches ===
10 October 1962

| Durham County | 3 - 13 | Scottish Border XV |
| Pen: Chapman | Report | Try: Grieve; Brown; Con: David Chisholm x 2 Pen: David Chisholm |

Gateshead
Referee: F.S. Robson

Durham County: H. Knox, M. G. Adamson, J. A. W. Baker, M. Harvey, J. M. Ranson, A. E. Chapman, A. C. W. A. Eccles, J. E. Close [captain], H. Lamb, D. Jesson, S. Hutton, I. Brown, M. G. Forster, G. C. D. Zissler, P. Ashworth
Scottish Border XV: J.H. Gray (Hawick), Christy Elliot (Langholm), G. D. Stevenson (Hawick) [captain], David Chisholm (Melrose), A. T. Grieve (Langholm), A. R. Broatch (Hawick), R. G. Turnbull (Hawick), A. A. Carson (Gala), Frank Laidlaw (Melrose), Norm Suddon (Hawick), Billy Hunter (Hawick), Jim Telfer (Melrose), Rob Valentine (Hawick), D. M. Brown (Melrose), C. E. B. Stewart (Kelso)

17 October 1962

| Scottish Border XV | 17 - 6 | Royal Air Force RU |
| Try: Billy Hunter; Con: David Chisholm; Pen: David Chisholm x 4 | Preview; Report | Try: Greenhow; Pen: Parsons |

Poynder Park, Kelso
Referee: G. K. Rome (Glasgow Academicals)

Scottish Border XV: J. H. Gray (Hawick), C. Elliot (Langholm), G. D. Stevenson (Hawick) [captain], David Chisholm (Melrose), W. Hollands (Gala), A. R. Broatch (Hawick), R. G. Turnbull (Hawick), Norm Suddon (Hawick), F. Laidlaw (Melrose), G. H. Willison (Hawick), Billy Hunter (Hawick), C. E. B. Stewart (Kelso), T. O. Grant (Hawick), R. Valentine (Hawick)
RAF: G. Hopkins (Leicester), G. Harries (Bedford), M. Greenhow (Wasps), J. J. Keepe (London Irish), I. Parsons (Saracens), S. Thomas (Bath), M. J. Dymond (Leicester), T. Wilson (Gloucester), J. Berry (Penzance), A. P. Close (Swansea), R. Glazscher (Plymouth), K. J. Mulligan (London Irish), B. E. Morgan (Oxford), K. G. Lappin (Leicester), J. V. McCarthy (London Irish)

=== International matches ===
21 November 1962

| Glasgow District | cancelled | Canada |
| | Preview |

Glasgow District: A. T. Henderson (Hutchesons' GSFP), G. R. Grieg (Glasgow HSFP), D. A. C. Montgomery (Glasgow Academicals), G. M. Simmers (Glasgow Academicals) [captain], I. F. Docherty (Glasgow HSFP), B. M. Simmers (Glasgow Academicals), A. E. C. Little (Glasgow HSFP), I. G. C. McLaren (Glasgow HSFP), I. G. Thomson (West of Scotland), T. E. R. Young (West of Scotland), A. J. McKellar (West of Scotland), Hamish Kemp (Glasgow HSFP), W. Davies (Glasgow University), A. D. Innes (Glasgow Academicals), J. Buchanan (Jordanhill)
Canada: D. Burgess, G. Full, R. M. Clark, R. McKee, J. Newton, J. D. B. Stubbs, P. J. P. Moroney, D. L. Moore, G. L. C. Paterson, P. R. Grantham, J. Lecky, D. M. Frid, W. G. Biarneson, R. S. Wilson, M. P. Chambers

24 November 1962

| Edinburgh District | 22 – 3 | Canada |
| Try: Fisher x 2 Robertson x 3 Goddard; Con: Colin Blaikie; Burnet | Report | Pen: Burgess |

Murrayfield Stadium
Referee: H. B. Laidlaw (Hawick)

Edinburgh District: Colin Blaikie (Heriots F.P), J. D. Jardine (Edinburgh Academicals), B. C. Henderson (Edinburgh Wanderers), P. J. Burnet (Edinburgh Academicals), W. S. Robertson (Edinburgh Wanderers), J. Blake (Royal HSFP), G. F. Goddard (Heriots F.P.), John Steven (Edinburgh Wanderers), G. I. Grahamslaw (Royal HSFP), J. B. Neill (Edinburgh Academicals), John Douglas (Stewart's College F.P.), J. K. Millar (Edinburgh Academicals), J. P. Fisher (Royal HSFP), A. C. McNish (Watsonians), K. I. Ross (Boroughmuir F. P.)
Canada: D. Burgess, G. Full, R. M. Clark, R. McKee, J. Newton, J. D. B. Stubbs, P. J. P. Moroney, D. L. Moore, G. L. C. Paterson, P. R. Grantham, J. Lecky, D. M. Frid, W. G. Biarneson, R. S. Wilson, M. P. Chambers

28 November 1962

| Provinces District | 24 – 12 | Canada |
| Try: David Chisholm; Grieve x 2 Billy Hunter ?pushover Con: David Chisholm x 3 Pen: David Chisholm | Report | Try: Granleese; Pen: Burnham x 3 |

Netherdale, Galashiels
Referee: D. C. J. McMahon (Heriots)

Provinces District: J.H. Gray (Hawick), A. T. Grieve (Langholm), A. R. Broatch (Hawick), G. D. Stevenson (Hawick), Christy Elliot (Langholm), David Chisholm (Melrose) [captain], Alex Hastie (Melrose), G. P. Hill (Gordonians), A. G. D. Whyte (Gordonians), I. C. Spence (Gordonians), Billy Hunter (Hawick), Jim Telfer (Melrose), Rob Valentine (Hawick), T. O. Grant (Hawick), R. J. C. Glasgow (Dunfermline)
Canada: I. B. Burnham, W. G. Stover, R. M. Clark, G. Wessels, J. Newton, J. D. B. Stubbs, J. M. Ward, D. L. Moore [captain], P. Frize, P. R. Grantham, D. N. Ure, W. Granleese, B. N. Williams, R. S. Wilson, M. P. Chambers
