= Robert Robertson (rugby union) =

Scotland international rugby union player

- Born: Robert Dalrymple Robertson; 28 July 1891 Woolwich, England
- Died: 19 December 1971 (aged 80) Battle, England

Rugby union career
Amateur team(s)
Years	Team	Apps	(Points)
- London Scottish
Provincial / State sides
Years	Team	Apps	(Points)
1911	Anglo-Scots		
1912	Whites Trial		
1912	London Counties		
International career
Years	Team	Apps	(Points)
1912	Scotland	1	(0)

Robert Robertson (28 July 1891 – 19 December 1971) was a Scotland international rugby union player.

== Rugby Union career ==
=== Amateur career ===
Robertson played rugby for London Scottish.

He was made captain of the club for season 1914–15, but the First World War intervened and his captaincy was then never displayed on the pitch.

=== Provincial career ===
He played for the Anglo-Scots against the Combined Scottish Districts side on 23 December 1911.

He played for the Whites Trial side against the Blues Trial side on 6 January 1912, while with London Scottish.

He was selected to play for London Counties against South Africa in their European tour, along with fellow Scotland players Lewis Robertson, Walter Michael Dickson and Charlie Usher, however Dickson did not play and his place was taken by another Scotland player William Purves. South Africa won the match 12 - 8.

The same 4 Scotland internationals that played the match were invited to play for London Counties in a return match against South Africa on 16 November 1912. However at this point the London clubs were getting frustrated by the number of representative matches their players had to face and the Scotland internationals thus took a stand and declined that invitation.

The Scottish Referee newspaper of 18 November 1912 noted:

A LONDON-SCOTTISH PROTEST. Trouble has been brewing for some time in Metropolitan Rugby circles (says the Sporting Life) and the action of the London Scottish forwards declining to play for London Counties against the South Africans is calculated to bring it to a head. The London clubs, with all their loyalty to the Union, have resented the introduction of so many representative matches at headquarters on Saturdays. Not without reason do they contend that the Springboks' fixtures might reasonably have been arranged for the mid-week, when they would not have clashed with the club games. For Saturday's match four of the London Scottish forwards —L. Robertson, R. D. Robertson, C. Usher, and W. D. C. L. Purves, all internationalists — were invited to play for London. They declined the honour by way of a protest. The London Scottish committee left their players free choice in the matter, though holding the opinion that the time has come when London club football should insist on more consideration in the matter of club fixtures. In their stand they have made they have the sympathy of practically all the Metropolitan Rugby clubs. Interviewed by a press representative; Mr. R. D. Robertson, the hon. secretary of the London Scottish club, said the action of the Scottish forwards in declining to play against the South Africans was in the first place due to their desire to play for their club against the Harlequins, and also as a protest against playing so many matches of a similar nature on Saturday at the expense of London club football.

=== International career ===
He was to play in only 1 international match, which was against France in 1912. He was not originally selected to play, but due to his London Scottish teammate Lewis Robertson who was originally selected for Scotland being unable to play in the match due to the death of his father, Robert was then drafted in as a replacement.

=== Administrative career ===
As noted above, Robertson became the Honorary Secretary of the London Scottish club. He proposed that Duggie Lyall Grant succeed him in office in 1913.

== Military career ==
He joined the Gordon Highlanders in 1911. During the First World War, Robertson was a captain in the Gordon Highlanders. Initially reported as missing in action in 1914 and presumed dead, he was later found to be wounded in battle and captured. He became later part in a prisoner swap deal with Germany in 1915 and thus made his way back to the United Kingdom. He was later promoted to Major.

== Family ==
He married Lucy Helen Jervois (1886–1969) in September 1933.
