= Frank Laidlaw =

Scottish rugby union player (1940–2025)

- Born: Francis Andrew Linden Laidlaw; 20 September 1940 Hawick, Scotland
- Died: 31 March 2025 (aged 84)

Rugby union career
- Position: Hooker
Amateur team(s)
Years	Team	Apps	(Points)
- Melrose
Provincial / State sides
Years	Team	Apps	(Points)
- Scottish Border XV
- South of Scotland District
- Whites Trial
International career
Years	Team	Apps	(Points)
1965–1971	Scotland	32	(0)
1966	British & Irish Lions	2	(0)

Francis Andrew Linden Laidlaw (20 September 1940 – 31 March 2025) was a Scotland international rugby union player.

== Career ==
Laidlaw played for Melrose.

Norman Mair once said that Frank Laidlaw regarded the loss of his own ball as he would a family bereavement.

Laidlaw played for a Scottish Border XV on 10 October 1962 in a warm up for that year's championship and to secure selection to the South side.

He played for South of Scotland District.

He played for the Whites Trial side on 15 December 1962, 9 February 1963 and 2 March 1963.

=== International ===
Laidlaw was capped thirty-two times for Scotland as a hooker between 1964 and 1971 and captained his country twice. His 1966 game against Wales was what was known as "the Melrose Game" by Bill McLaren because his club, Melrose, had four players on the national side: the others being Alex Hastie, David Chisholm and Jim Telfer. Scotland won 11–5.

He toured twice with the British & Irish Lions:- to Australia and New Zealand in 1966 and New Zealand in 1971.

== Outside rugby ==
Laidlaw was born in Hawick, Scotland on 20 September 1940. He was a proponent of Scientology. Laidlaw died on 31 March 2025, at the age of 84.
