= William Purves =

William Purves may refer to:

- William Purves (banker) (born 1932), Scottish banker
- William Purves (rugby union) (fl. 1912–1913), Scottish rugby union player
- Bill Purves (born 1870), Irish professional footballer
- William Laidlaw Purves (1842–1917), Scottish surgeon

== See also ==
- William Purvis (disambiguation)
