= John Hume (rugby union) =

Scotland international rugby union player

- Born: John Hume; 17 March 1890 Edinburgh, Scotland
- Died: 20 December 1969 (aged 79) Leeds, England

Rugby union career
- Position: Scrum half
Amateur team(s)
Years	Team	Apps	(Points)
1911-21	Royal HSFP		
1921-	Headingley		
Provincial / State sides
Years	Team	Apps	(Points)
1911-20	Edinburgh District		
1912	Whites Trial		
1912	Combined Scottish Districts		
1913	Scotland Possibles		
1920	Cities District		
1920	Provinces District		
1921	Scotland Probables		
International career
Years	Team	Apps	(Points)
1912-22	Scotland	7	(3)

John Hume (17 March 1890, Edinburgh – 20 December 1969, Leeds) was a Scotland international rugby union player.

== Rugby Union career ==
=== Amateur career ===
He played for Royal HSFP. He played for Headingley from October 2021 and he captained the side that first season.

=== Provincial career ===
He played for Edinburgh District in their match against Glasgow District on 2 December 1911. In 1920, he turned out for Edinburgh District again in the same fixture.

He was then picked to play for Whites Trial in their match against Blues Trial on 6 January 1912.

The following season he was involved in the Combined Scottish Districts match against South Africa on 27 November 1912 and the final trial and turned out for Scotland Possibles against Scotland Probables on 18 January 1913.

He played for Cities District against Provinces District on 11 December 1920.

The same season, he turned out for Provinces District in their match against Scottish Exiles on 25 December 1920. The Sunday Post of 26 December 1920 noting:

As half Hume again had almost a field day, and to his fine rooting and service the Home threes owed their chance to make good. Realising fairly early that Simpson was too selfish to be any help to his backs, Hume time and again slung the ball well out to Wilson or Mackenzie, a policy which paid. Whether getting the ball, spoiling, or kicking, Hume was equally excellent.

His form got him promoted finally to the Scotland Probables side on 8 January 1921 in the final trial match.

=== International career ===
He was capped 7 times for Scotland between 1912 and 1922.

In 1922 Hume retired from international rugby. The Edinburgh Evening News of 2 December 1922 noting:

We required to call in four half-backs last season. Of these, John Hume, the Royal High School veteran, played only in the French match. It is understood that he is confining himself this season to Headingley club football, and that his international days are done. His is a meritorious record.
