= Allan Massie =

Scottish journalist and novelist (1938–2026)

Allan Massie CBE FRSL FRSE
- Born: Allan Johnstone Massie; 16 October 1938; Singapore, Straits Settlements, British Malaya
- Died: 3 February 2026 (aged 87); Selkirk, Scottish Borders, Scotland
- Citizenship: British
- Education: Glenalmond College; Trinity College, Cambridge
- Occupation: Writer
- Years active: 1976–2026
- Employer: The Scotsman
- Political party: Conservative
- Spouse: Alison Langlands (m. 1973; died 2022)
- Children: 3, including Alex
- Awards: Scottish Arts Council Book Award, Frederick Niven Literary Award

Allan Johnstone Massie CBE FRSL FRSE (16 October 1938 – 3 February 2026) was a Scottish journalist, columnist and sports writer who worked for several newspapers in both England and Scotland. Massie was also the author of 40 books, including over 25 novels.

== Early life ==
Massie was born on 16 October 1938, in Singapore, where his father was a rubber planter for Sime Darby. Massie spent his childhood in Aberdeenshire, Scotland. He was educated at Drumtochty Castle preparatory school and Glenalmond College in Perthshire, before going on to attend Trinity College, Cambridge, where he read history.

== Career ==
=== Journalist ===
Massie was a journalist and critic of fiction, writing regular columns for The Scotsman, The Sunday Times (Scotland) and the Scottish Daily Mail. He was The Scotsman's chief fiction reviewer for a quarter of a century and also regularly wrote about rugby union and cricket for that paper. He retired from the newspaper in 2026. He was also a columnist for The Daily Telegraph, the Glasgow Herald, and was the Sunday Standard's television critic during that paper's brief existence. He was also a contributor to The Spectator—where he wrote an occasional column, Life and Letters—the Literary Review, The Independent, and the Catholic Herald. He also wrote for the New York Review of Books.

His conservative political outlook is apparent, despite the then decline of Conservative influence in Scotland. He was a leading, if lonely, campaigner against Scottish devolution, and a critic of much of the legislation passed by the Scottish Parliament since its establishment in 1999. Though initially in favour of greater devolutionary powers for Scotland, his views on devolution changed during the Thatcher years and he came to regret his support for the 1979 devolution referendum.

In his literary reviews, his preferences laid towards traditional novels rather than the avant-garde. He was a great admirer of Sir Walter Scott (and a past president of the Sir Walter Scott Club). Among contemporary novelists, he was a champion of the Russian writer Andreï Makine and Scotland's William McIlvanney. Though he criticised Irvine Welsh and James Kelman, he admired some of the latter's work, arguing that Kelman is an important voice for a section of society often ignored in literary fiction.

=== Novelist ===
Massie was the author of over 40 books, including more than 25 novels. He is notable for writing about the distant past, and the middle class, rather than grittier elements of the present. The most successful of his novels, at least in terms of sales, have been a series of reconstructed autobiographies or biographies of Roman political figures, including Augustus, Tiberius, Mark Antony, Caesar, Caligula and Nero's heirs. Gore Vidal called him a "master of the long-ago historical novel." His last book is The Thistle and the Rose, a series of essays on the often thorny relationship between Scotland and England, in which he takes a strong Unionist viewpoint.

His 1989 novel about Vichy France, A Question of Loyalties, won the Saltire Society's Scottish Book of the Year award, an award he was shortlisted for more than once. The Sins of the Fathers (1991) caused a controversy when Nicholas Mosley resigned from the judging panel for the Booker Prize, protesting that none of his books (of which Massie's was the favourite) made it on to the shortlist (Martin Amis's Time's Arrow edged out Massie's novel for the final spot on the six-book list).

Those two novels, and Shadows of Empire constitute a loose trilogy in which a constant concern is the potential danger of idealism and ideology, as well as the struggle to lead a decent personal life in indecent political times.

In 2009, Massie brought out what he calls "a private novel" (i.e. an examination of private morality rather than the large political or "public" dilemmas examined in his other contemporary novels). This innovative work, Surviving, is set in Rome and concerns a group of English-speaking alcoholics and the intensity of their friendships. It is also a highly personal work, reflecting the author's own experience of Italy in the 1970s, although the book is set in the 1990s.

His 2010 novel, Death in Bordeaux, sees Massie return to Vichy France in the first of a trilogy.

Other works include critical studies of Muriel Spark and Colette as well as histories of Edinburgh and Glasgow and A Portrait of Scottish Rugby.

Massie was appointed Commander of the Order of the British Empire (CBE) in the 2013 Birthday Honours for services to literature.

== All-time Scotland XV ==
Massie was a keen rugby fan and writer, and came up with an all-time XV in 1984. Firstly, he excluded any players from before 1951, as he said it is unfair to judge the abilities of players without having been able to see them for himself, and secondly, his list, being published in the mid 80s excludes most of the people involved in the 1990 Grand Slam:

- Backline: Andy Irvine, Arthur Smith, Jim Renwick, Ken Scotland, Roger Baird;
- Half backs John Rutherford, Roy Laidlaw;
- Forwards: Hugh McLeod, Colin Deans, Sandy Carmichael, Gordon Brown, Alastair McHarg, Douglas Elliot, Jim Telfer (captain), David Leslie

He also supplied a list of reserves:

- Jock Turner, David Chisholm, Alex Hastie, David Rollo, Norman Bruce, Iain Paxton

Players that Massie included in his early selection, but not in the final team include:

- Ian Laughland, Chris Rea, Ian McGeechan, Robertson, David Johnston; Aitken, Milne, Bruce, Laidlaw, Mike Campbell-Lamerton, Peter Brown, Tomes, Cuthbertson, Jim Greenwood, Ron Glasgow, Derrick Grant, Rodger Arneil, Jim Calder.

== Personal life and death ==
Massie married Alison Langlands in 1973; she died in 2022. They had three children, including journalist Alex Massie. Massie later lived in Selkirk, Scottish Borders.

On 19 January 2026, Massie retired from reviewing books for The Scotsman, announcing that he had cancer. He died on 3 February 2026, at the age of 87.

== Awards ==
Massie received the following awards:

- Scottish Arts Council Book Award for The Death of Men (1982)
- Frederick Niven Literary Award for The Last Peacock (1980)

== Bibliography ==
=== Novels ===
- Change and Decay in All Around I See (1978)
- The Last Peacock (1980)
- The Death of Men (1981)
- One Night in Winter (1984)
- Augustus (1986)
- A Question of Loyalties (1989)
- The Hanging Tree (1990)
- Tiberius (1991)
- The Sins of the Father (1991)
- Caesar (1993)
- The Ragged Lion (1994)
- These Enchanted Woods (sequel to The Last Peacock) (1993)
- King David (1995)
- Shadows of Empire (1997)
- Antony (1997)
- Nero's Heirs (1999)
- The Evening of the World (2001)
- Arthur the King (2003)
- Caligula (2003)
- Charlemagne and Roland (2009)
- Surviving (2009)
- Klaus and other stories (2010)
- Death in Bordeaux (2010)
- Dark Summer in Bordeaux (2012)
- Cold Winter in Bordeaux (2014)
- End Games in Bordeaux (2015)

=== Non-fiction ===
- Muriel Spark (1979)
- Ill Met by Gaslight: Five Edinburgh Murders (1980)
- The Caesars (1983)
- Aberdeen: Portrait of a City (1984)
- A Portrait of Scottish Rugby (Polygon, Edinburgh; ISBN 0-904919-84-6) (1984)
- Colette (1986)
- 101 Great Scots (1987)
- Byron's Travels (1988)
- The Novelist's View of the Market Economy (1988)
- How Should Health Services be Financed?: A Patient's View (1988)
- Glasgow: Portraits of a City (1989)
- The Novel Today: A Critical Guide to the British Novel, 1970–1989 (1990)
- Edinburgh (1994)
- The History of Selkirk Merchant Company 1694–1994 (1994)
- The Thistle and the Rose: Six Centuries of Love and Hate Between the Scots and the English (2005)
- The Royal Stuarts: A History of the Family That Shaped Britain (2010)

=== Edited books ===
- Edinburgh and the Borders: In Verse (1983)
- P.E.N. New Fiction II (1987)

=== "The History Man" columns in Scots Heritage Magazine ===
Date	Issue : Pages	Topic(s)
2014	65 (Autumn) : 18–19	Edinburgh International Festival

=== Book reviews ===
Date	Review article	Work(s) reviewed
4 October 2008	Massie, Allan (4 October 2008). "A very slippery book". Books. The Spectator.	Kinglake, Alexander William (1844). Eothen. John Ollivier.

== Reviews ==
- McKie, Dave (1980), review of The Last Peacock, in Bold, Christine (ed.), Cencrastus No. 3, Summer 1980, pp. 42 & 43.
