= Sandy Gunn (rugby union) =

Scotland international rugby union player

- Born: Alexander William Gunn; 16 November 1890 Pontypool, Wales
- Died: 1 April 1980 (aged 89) Stowlangtoft, England

Rugby union career
- Position: Fly half
Amateur team(s)
| Years | Team | Apps | (Points) |
- Royal HSFP
Provincial / State sides
| Years | Team | Apps | (Points) |
| 1911-12 | Edinburgh District | | |
| 1912 | Whites Trial | | |
| 1912 1912 | Combined Scottish Districts; Blues Trial | | |
International career
| Years | Team | Apps | (Points) |
| 1912-13 | Scotland | 5 | (3) |

Sandy Gunn (16 November 1890 – 1 April 1980) was a Scotland international rugby union player. His regular playing position was fly half.

== Rugby Union career ==
=== Amateur career ===
Gunn played for Royal HSFP.

On 7 April 1911 The Scottish Referee newspaper while noting that Hawick would probably be the favourites instead tipped the Royal HSFP side to win the Melrose Sevens in 1911 stating that if they pick their best side of G. A. McLaren, Sandy Gunn, J. Hume, A. Elder, A. C. Brown, W. A. Kennedy, and W. J. Sommerville, that they would take a lot of beating. However Hawick did win the Melrose Sevens that year.

Gunn scored a respectable 11 tries for Royal in the 1910-11 season.

=== Provincial career ===
Gunn played for Edinburgh District against Glasgow District in the inter-city match of 2 December 1911 and in the inter-city match of 7 December 1912.

Gunn played for Whites Trial against Blues Trial on 6 January 1912.

The first outing of the Combined Scottish Districts was originally deemed a 'Glasgow and Districts' line-up, despite players from all around Scotland actually outnumbering those from Glasgow District. Gunn played for the combined district side on 27 November 1912 against South Africa.

Gunn played for Blues Trial against Whites Trial on 21 December 1912.

=== International career ===
Gunn played in 5 tests for Scotland.

Gunn was picked instead at Centre for the match against South Africa.

=== Administrative career ===
Gunn was named as a committee member of Royal HSFP in 1913.

== Family ==
Gunn's parents were James Gunn (1851-1929) and Christina Bell Turner (1852-1914). They had 2 daughters: Christina Sinclair Gunn (1884-1969) and Catherine Jane Turner Gunn (1888-1959) and 2 sons: James Turner Gunn (1881-1968) and Sandy noted here.

James Gunn was from Caithness and Christina Bell Turner was from Argyll, but they moved to Wales in their thirties, for a few years before returning to Scotland. While James Turner Gunn and Christina Sinclair Gunn were both born in Scotland, Catherine Jane Turner Gunn and Sandy were born in Pontypool in Wales.

Sandy married Marjorie Ruth Clare Anderson (1896-1961) in St. Silas Episcopal Church in Glasgow on 9 January 1923.

They had a son Alasdair Turner Gray Gunn (1926-2014).
