= Combined Scottish Districts =

(Scotland) Scottish Districts
- Full name: Combined Scottish Districts
- Founded: 1911
- Coach: Roy Laidlaw (last coach)

Combined Scottish Districts is a select Scottish provincial amateur rugby union team that draws its players from Glasgow District, Edinburgh District, North of Scotland District, Midlands District, South of Scotland District and Scottish Exiles District. It is occasionally known as the Scottish Districts side.

Like all District sides in Scotland, this was open to any nationality of players that played in Scotland. However, in practice it was used to showcase Scottish talent, and the side was formed primarily to play against international opposition.

== History ==
=== Formation ===
The first match can be taken as the 'Scottish side' which played the Anglo-Scots on 23 December 1911, as a trial match.

The first international match of the Combined Scottish Districts side can be taken as on 27 November 1912 to play against South Africa at New Anniesland in Glasgow.

It was officially billed as a 'Glasgow and Districts' side but a cursory look at the side reveals players from South of Scotland District, Midlands District, Edinburgh District as well as Glasgow District in the team fielded.

Only the Glasgow Herald reported the resulting team as a 'Glasgow and Districts' side.

The Scotsman reported the team more accurately as a 'Scottish' side. It noted:

SCOTTISH FIFTEEN v SOUTH AFRICANS. EASY VICTORY FOR THE COLONIALS

What was officially designated a Glasgow and Districts fifteen, was really a Scottish one, containing as it did men from all parts of the country, north, south, east, and west, proved no match yesterday for the South Africans who then played their second and concluding engagement in Scotland.

The majority of the players came from outwith Glasgow District:

- From South of Scotland District: Borth Todd (Gala), J. Brown (Melrose), J. Moffat (Langholm), M. Jardine (Gala)
- From Midlands District: J. R. Philip (Panmure), J. Law (Panmure)
- From Edinburgh District: Sandy Gunn (Royal HSFP), John Hume (Royal HSFP)

=== Matches against other districts ===
Occasionally the Combined Scottish Districts side would play against other District sides in Scotland.

=== Last match ===
The last match the side played was against Australia in 1996. This match was organised before the Scottish districts turned professional. Roy Laidlaw was the head coach of the side at the time.

== Partial list of games played against international opposition ==
Year	Date	Opponent	Venue	Result	Score	Tour
1912	27 November	South Africa	New Anniesland, Glasgow	Loss	3 - 38	1912–13 South Africa rugby union tour of Europe
1965	13 April	South Africa	Mansfield Park, Hawick	Win	16 - 8	1965 South Africa rugby union tour of Scotland and Ireland
1967	29 November	New Zealand	Greenyards, Melrose	Loss	14 - 35	1967 New Zealand rugby union tour of Britain, France and Canada
1968	30 October	Australia	Hughenden Stadium, Glasgow	Loss	9 - 14	1968 Australia rugby union tour of British Isles
1994	12 November	South Africa	Old Anniesland, Glasgow	Loss	6 - 33	1994 South Africa rugby union tour of Britain and Ireland
1996	5 November	Australia	McDiarmid Park, Perth	Loss	9 - 25	1996 Australia rugby union tour of Europe

== Notable former players ==
=== Scotland Internationalists ===
- (Scotland) Martin Scott
- (Scotland) Sandy Gunn
- (Scotland) Bob Keddie
- (Scotland) Ronnie Eriksson
- (Scotland) Budge Pountney
- (Scotland) Christy Elliot
- (Scotland) Fletcher Buchanan
- (Scotland) Billy Hunter
- (Scotland) Eric Peters
- (Scotland) Colin Blaikie
- (Scotland) Jimmy Dobson
- (Scotland) Jim Telfer
- (Scotland) Michael Dods
- (Scotland) Borth Todd
- (Scotland) Ian McCrae
- (Scotland) Ron Glasgow
- (Scotland) Mattie Stewart
