= Laidlaw Purves =

Laidlaw Purves MD, MRCS, LRCP
- Purves in 1896. Detail from original colour portrait by John Collier.
- Born: William Laidlaw Purves; 16 April 1842; Edinburgh, Scotland
- Died: 30 December 1917 (aged 75); Wimbledon, England
- Education: University of Edinburgh
- Occupation: Surgeon
- Known for: Contributions to golf handicapping Support for women's golf
- Medical career
- Field: Ophthalmology, Aural surgery
- Institutions: Guy's Hospital, London

William Laidlaw Purves LRCS, LRCP (16 April 1842 – 30 December 1917) was a Scottish-born surgeon who worked in London as an aural and ophthalmic surgeon. He contributed specialist articles to the medical literature but is mainly remembered for his contributions to golf. He planned and designed the course that became Royal St Georges in Kent and was an important figure in the establishment of the Ladies Golf Union in the United Kingdom. He was a prime mover in introducing the rules of handicapping into British golf.

== Early life ==
Purves was born in Hill Place, Edinburgh, in 1842, the third son of a surgeon William Brown Purves (1799–1852) and his wife Margaret Purves (née Laidlaw) (1798–1855). By the time he was 13, both his parents had died and he was brought up by two spinster aunts, Jane and Euphemia Laidlaw. From this time, as a tribute to them and his mother he styled himself "Laidlaw Purves".

He went to school at the Royal High School, Edinburgh, and was then apprenticed as a lawyer to William Forbes Skene, a Writer to the Signet, who later became known for his work as a historian, author of the acclaimed Celtic Scotland, and Historiographer Royal for Scotland. Realising that he did not wish to embark on a career in law, Purves began to study medicine in his spare time, going on to enter the University of Edinburgh Medical School. In 1862, while still a student, he joined the crew of the whaler SS Polynia, completing an eight-month round trip from Dundee to Newfoundland. This was common practice amongst Edinburgh medical students, the best known example being Arthur Conan Doyle. In 1864 he qualified as a Licentiate of the Royal College of Surgeons of Edinburgh (LRCS) and Licentiate of the Royal College of Physicians of Edinburgh (LRCP), graduating MD from the University of Edinburgh later that year.

== Surgical career ==
Purves worked in hospitals in Edinburgh and Cardiff before emigrating to Australia where he set up in medical practice in Horsham, Victoria. Here he also acted as a coroner for Victoria. After five years he returned to Europe where he trained in ophthalmic surgery and aural surgery at Berlin, Vienna, Paris and Utrecht. In Utrecht he worked with Professor Franciscus Donders (1818–1889), who had established the first eye hospital in the Netherlands and made major contributions to the study of refraction and of astigmatism. Donders also pioneered standardization of voice tests of hearing and made research contributions in the science of phonetics. In 1874, with this experience in ophthalmic and aural surgery, Purves was appointed lecturer and aural surgeon to Guy's Hospital, London. He began a private practice in aural and ophthalmic surgery in Hanover Street, London. His contributions to the specialty literature were published mainly in Guy's Hospital Gazette. In 1884, just one year after the introduction of the audiometer, he gave a full account of the way in which a hearing test should be conducted. He published an article on the common problem of removal of foreign bodies from the ear, which was a practical guide intended for students and general practitioners. He retired from his Guy's appointment in 1902.

== Golfing achievements ==
Purves had played golf at Bruntsfield Links in Edinburgh as a student and by the time of his London appointment he was a member of both the Honorable Company of Edinburgh Golfers and the Royal and Ancient Golf Club of St Andrews. In 1874, on his move to London, he joined the London Scottish and Wimbledon Golf Club. Shortly after this the club separated into two separate clubs, The London Scottish Golf Club and the Wimbledon Golf Club although they both continued to play on Wimbledon Common. In 1882 the Wimbledon became the Royal Wimbledon Golf Club and Purves became an active committee member and was later elected Captain. The golfers had to share the Common with the public and were restricted as to when they could play. Purves, together with a fellow Scot and keen amateur golfer Henry Lamb (1844–1893) began to look along the south coast of England for the site for a links golf course, similar to the ones they had both played on since childhood in the east coast of Scotland. In 1887 they selected a site at Sandwich in Kent where Purves designed and supervised the laying out of a course which he called St George's and later became Royal St George's Golf Club. His aim was that the course should emulate and rival St Andrews, and it was, in 1894, the first course outside Scotland to host the Open Championship. In 1888 he designed the Littlestone golf course at New Romney, Kent.

Purves became an active supporter of women's golf. In 1872, the Wimbledon Golf Club had laid out a nine-hole course for women and created the Wimbledon Ladies Golf Club. Purves arranged and presided over a meeting of the 15 ladies' golf clubs in the UK in 1893 which led to the formation of the Ladies' Golf Union (LGU) later that year. Issette Pearson, a Wimbledon Ladies member, was its first secretary. The support of Purves was described as crucial in its foundation and Amy Pascoe, who won the Ladies Championship in 1896, described Purves as the "fairy godfather of ladies' golf".

Purves, Henry Lamb and Issette Pearson were the three key figures in the introduction of the system of handicap into the UK. The golf historian C.B. Clapcott in his History of Handicapping wrote that "Dr. Laidlaw Purves set out the rules for universal handicapping (1898) which were evolved at Wimbledon. These rules indeed may be regarded as the basis upon which the British Golf Union's Joint Advisory Council have built up their system of uniform handicapping (average of the best three scores over two years of medal scores with compulsory handing in of signed scorecards)". The LGU adopted the system before the British Golf Union adopted them for men and also developed a system of course rating. Issette Pearson appointed 'handicap advisers' who visited LGU clubs giving standard scratch score ratings to the courses. In 1898 Purves with Henry Lamb and Issette Pearson were at the forefront of the introduction of similar standards in British men's golf.

== Later life and death ==
Purves became a member of the Worshipful Company of Girdlers and on his retirement from Guy's became master of the company. He was a member of no fewer than 32 golf clubs by the time of his death. He died at his home Hardwick Cottage, Wimbledon Common on 30 December 1917.

== Family ==
In 1867 in Melbourne, Australia, Purves married Rebecca Grant (c.1845 – 4 October 1877), daughter of James Grant, of Edinburgh. There were no children. After Rebecca's death, he married Elizabeth Adie in London. She was a member of the Edinburgh-based family firm of opticians and instrument makers, her father running the London branch. They had two daughters and four sons. Proud of his Scottish roots, Purves sent his sons for schooling at Fettes College in Edinburgh. The two eldest played rugby for Scotland. Alexander Buckholm Laidlaw (Alex) Purves represented London Scottish and was capped ten times for Scotland. The second son, William Donald Campbell Laidlaw Purves played for London Scottish and was capped six times for Scotland.
