= Tiberius (Massie novel) =

1991 novel by Allan Massie

- First edition
- Author: Allan Massie
- Language: English
- Genre: Historical novel
- Publisher: Hodder & Stoughton
- Publication date: 1991
- Publication place: United Kingdom
- Media type: Print (hardback & paperback)
- Pages: 352
- ISBN: 0340487887
- Preceded by: The Hanging Tree
- Followed by: The Sins of the Father

Tiberius is a 1991 historical novel by Scottish writer Allan Massie, about the Roman Emperor Tiberius. It is the second in the series of novels Massie wrote about the early Roman Emperors.

== Synopsis ==
Like its predecessor Augustus, it is written as a memoir towards the end of the old Emperor's life. Unlike other writers and historians who portrayed Rome's third Emperor as a reprobate of monstrous proportions, in Massie's book he describes himself as a “melancholic and reluctant” autocrat, wallowing in the “solitude of power”. His supposed self-description seems honest and pained. In his middle years, tired of fighting the indefatigable Germans and regretting his part in turning Rome into a despotism he retires to his holiday home on the Greek island of Rhodes, until the squalid rumours circulating the Empire about his supposed sexual proclivities force him to return to the seat of power. He regrets his marriage to Julia, forced on him by his stepfather the Emperor Augustus, yet bows to his mother Livia’s advice, acknowledging the importance of her politically astute machinations to his career.
