= Mike Campbell-Lamerton =

British Lions & Scotland international rugby union player

- Born: 1 August 1933 Valletta, Malta
- Died: 17 March 2005 (aged 71)
- Height: 6 ft 5 in (1.96 m)
- Weight: 17 st (110 kg; 240 lb)

Rugby union career
- Position: Number 8
Amateur team(s)
| Years | Team | Apps | (Points) |
- Army
| – | Halifax | | |
| – | Blackheath | | |
| – | London Scottish | | |
Provincial / State sides
| Years | Team | Apps | (Points) |
| 1962-63 | Blues Trial | | |
International career
| Years | Team | Apps | (Points) |
| 1959-1965 | Scotland | 23 | |
| 1966 | British and Irish Lions | 8 | (3) |

Colonel Michael John Campbell-Lamerton OBE (1 August 1933 – 17 March 2005) was a Scotland international player. He was also a British Army officer.

== Military career ==
He was educated at Ottershaw School near Chertsey, Surrey. National Service took him to the Duke of Wellington's Regiment (West Riding) in 1952, the start of 33 years' service in the Army during which he served in Korea and Cyprus.

He and his lifelong friend, David Gilbert-Smith, led two platoons of the Duke of Wellington's Regiment (West Riding) during the Battle of the Hook in Korea, recovering positions overrun by the Chinese offensive. Campbell-Lamerton had already escaped a life-threatening injury at school when, aged 15, he was struck on the chest by a javelin; he courted death again on foot patrol in Korea when he trod on a mine. Hearing the faint click, he remained still while the corporal with him, who had worked in bomb disposal during the Second World War, rendered it safe.

Three years later, serving in Cyprus during the EOKA campaign, he fell 60 ft from a helicopter in full combat gear, sustaining severe back, hip and leg injuries.

In his military career, he rose to the rank of colonel, leading him to command a battalion in Northern Ireland, thence to the Royal Military Academy, Sandhurst, where he was commander of Old College and Victory College.

== Rugby Union career ==
=== Amateur career ===
He played rugby for his regiment (The 'Dukes'), the Army Rugby Union and Combined Services, and club rugby with Halifax, Blackheath Rugby Club and London Scottish RFC.

=== Provincial career ===
He played for the Blues Trial side against the Whites Trial side in 1962 and 1963.

=== International career ===
His debut for Scotland came against France at Colombes on 7 January 1961. He went on to gain 23 Scotland caps as he appeared in the next five seasons, twice as captain in 1965. He was picked for the 1962 British Lions tour to South Africa, playing all four internationals at number eight. But when the Lions team was selected for the 1966 tour, he was 32, no longer captain of his country and the leadership was expected to go to Alun Pask, the outstanding Welsh No. 8. Massie says that "You would have had no doubt that he [Mike Campbell-Lamerton] could push in the scrum, and with him and Frans Ten Bos together it achieved a solidity and power that had long been lacking." Campbell-Lamerton was 6 ft 5 inches and 17 stone.

However, he also says that Lamerton was not a good national captain: "He was perhaps over-conscientious and a worrier, and hardly spoke the same language as many of the team; it affected his play." In terms of sheer entertainment value, Massie says, "I doubt if any other Scottish lock forward has given so much fun, not even Alastair McHarg."

Richard Bath writes of him that he was "A strong scrummager who held his own in the at the line-out and was a considerable presence in the loose, Campbell-Lamerton excelled in the second row for Scotland from his first cap in 1961 until his 23rd in 1966."

Allan Massie provides a more colourful description of him:

The sight of captain M.J. Campbell-Lamerton of the Duke of Wellington's Regiment surging round the tail of a line-out like an enraged hippopotamus was one of the most stirring spectacles in Scottish Rugby. A huge man, 6 feet 5 inches and often over 17 stones, he made an abrupt and unheralded entry into top-class Rugby for a Combined Services team against a Scottish Select at Murrayfield in December 1960. The game was played in a thick haar, and almost the only impression spectators retained of it was of this man-mountain surging out of mist as a mastodon from a primeval swamp. It took him into the Scottish team and he stayed there til 1966 to win twenty-three caps.

==== Lions in New Zealand (1966) ====
Though the Lions beat Australia in successive internationals, the New Zealand section of the tour was marred by ill feeling. After the game with Canterbury, the Lions captain for the day, Jim Telfer, said at the after match function: "I would not describe today's game as dirty because all our games in New Zealand have been dirty." Understandably this caused a furore but it was the backdrop against which Campbell-Lamerton had to keep his players united.

Campbell-Lamerton, would not have been out of place in the modern game: he was a big man, at 6 feet 5 inches, weighing more than 17 stone, yet athletic enough to play No. 8 as well as his accustomed position in the second row. During the 1966 British Lions tour of New Zealand, his leadership was characterized by a level of commitment that supported the team during a challenging period.

At one stage the manager, Des O'Brien left the party for a reconnaissance mission to Fiji (where a final tour game was to be played), and the coach, John Robins, was in hospital with damaged ankle ligaments, leaving Campbell-Lamerton with far greater responsibilities than any modern equivalent would face. Yet in a squad which he had not been expected to captain, his players still speak warmly of the example he set after a tour in which the Lions lost all four internationals against the All Blacks. The recurrence of an ankle injury which caused his withdrawal from the second game against New Zealand, did not help and he also missed the final international. "Mike was a decent man and much-maligned", Brian Price, his second-row partner in three of the tour internationals, said. "We knew how hard he was working and it was because we respected his efforts, we stuck together."

=== Coaching career ===
After the tour he retired from playing rugby. In 1972 he was appointed to coach the British Combined services team.

== Post-military ==
He left the Army in 1985 and became bursar at Balliol College, Oxford, later being elected an Emeritus Fellow of the college. He also took a close interest in the fortunes of the university rugby club, whose president he eventually became. He was elected a Knight of Malta, the organisation which raises funds for Catholic charities. In 2001 prostate cancer was diagnosed, an illness he endured with great fortitude until his death on 17 March 2005, aged 71.

== Family ==
Campbell-Lamerton was born on 1 August 1933 at the Royal Naval Hospital in Valletta, Malta, the elder of two sons of R.H.C. Lamerton, Warrant Engineer R.N., who died at Chatham Hospital, July 21, 1944, and his wife, Margaret.

In 1956 Campbell-Lamerton met and married Marie-Christine (née Cottrell) while stationed in Gibraltar. They had three sons: Jeremy, (born 1959) who also played lock for Scotland five times in the 1986–87 season (and whose daughter, Olivia [Lily Campbell-Lamerton], played tennis for Great Britain), Michael Patrick (born 1958), Ian Anthony (born 1962) and a daughter Clare Josephine Margaret (born 1961).

== Awards and honours ==
Campbell-Lamerton received a MBE in 1974, then an OBE in 1979.

== Sources ==
- Bath, Richard (ed.) The Complete Book of Rugby (Seven Oaks Ltd, 1997 ISBN 1-86200-013-1)
- Massie, Allan A Portrait of Scottish Rugby (Polygon, Edinburgh; ISBN 0-904919-84-6)
