= Gregor Sharp =

Scotland international rugby union player

- Born: Gregor Sharp; 20 April 1934 Carfin, Scotland
- Died: 27 November 2006 (aged 72) Hawick, Scotland

Rugby union career
- Position: Fly Half
Amateur team(s)
| Years | Team | Apps | (Points) |
| - | Stewart's College FP | | |
- Army
| 1970 | Aberdeenshire | | |
Provincial / State sides
| Years | Team | Apps | (Points) |
| 1956- | Edinburgh District | | |
| 1963 | Blues Trial | | |
| 1963 | Scotland Possibles | | |
International career
| Years | Team | Apps | (Points) |
| 1960-64 | Scotland | 4 | (0) |
Coaching career
- Years: Team
- 1970: Aberdeenshire
- 1970: Gordonians

Gregor Sharp (20 April 1934 – 27 November 2006) was a Scotland international rugby union player.

== Rugby Union career ==
=== Amateur career ===
He played for Stewart's College FP.

He also played for the Army.

He played for Aberdeenshire on his move to Aberdeen.

=== Provincial career ===
He played for Edinburgh District in the Scottish Inter-District Championship.

He played for the Blues Trial side in 1963.

He played for Scotland Possibles the following season at the end of 1963.

=== International career ===
He was capped four times between 1960 and 1964 for Scotland.

He also played for the Scotland-Ireland team against England-Wales in 1959.

=== Coaching career ===
He coached both Aberdeenshire and Gordonians, when his work took him to Aberdeen.

== Tennis career ==
He played tennis for Edinburgh Waverley, and on moving to Aberdeenshire played for Stonehaven. He won the Scottish Cup with Edinburgh Waverley.
