= Norm Suddon =

Scotland international rugby union player (1943–2022)

- Born: Norman Suddon; 28 June 1943 Cavers, Scotland
- Died: 18 April 2022 (aged 78)
- Height: 6 ft 0 in (1.83 m)
- Weight: 90 kg (14 st 2 lb)

Rugby union career
- Position: Prop
Amateur team(s)
Years	Team	Apps	(Points)
- Hawick
Provincial / State sides
Years	Team	Apps	(Points)
- Scottish Border XV
-	South of Scotland District		
-	Whites Trial		
–	Blues Trial		
–	Scotland Probables		
International career
Years	Team	Apps	(Points)
1965-70	Scotland	13	(0)

Norm Suddon (28 June 1943 – 18 April 2022) was a Scotland international rugby union player. He played as a Prop.

== Rugby Union career ==
=== Amateur career ===
Suddon played for Hawick. He was deemed a protege of Hugh McLeod, a long-time Hawick prop.

=== Provincial career ===
Suddon played for a Scottish Border XV in their October 1962 matches against Durham County and Royal Air Force Rugby Union; both warm-up matches to help selection to the South district side.

He played for South of Scotland District.

He played for the Whites Trial side in their match against the Blues Trial side on 9 February 1963. After impressing he then turned out for the Blues Trial side against the Whites Trial side in their final match that season on 2 March 1963.

Suddon played for Scotland Probables in their match against Scotland Possibles on 31 December 1966. However after a poor display by the Probables front row, Suddon was deemed a 'scapegoat' by the Aberdeen Press and Journal when he was left out of the Scotland international team to meet France in January 1967.

He was named for Scotland Probables in their match against Scotland Possibles on 9 January 1971. However he had to withdraw due to a knee injury that he sustained in his club match prior to this. Suddon had to have surgery on his cartilage.

=== International career ===
Suddon was capped 13 times for Scotland.

He also played in a combined Scotland-Ireland team that played against England-Wales on 14 October 1972 to mark the SRU centenary.

== Later life and death ==
Suddon worked as a hosiery worker in Hawick. He died on 18 April 2022, at the age of 78.
