= Colin Blaikie =

Scotland international rugby union player

- Born: Colin Fraser Blaikie; 21 November 1941 (age 84) Edinburgh, Scotland

Rugby union career
- Position: Full Back
Amateur team(s)
Years	Team	Apps	(Points)
1954-	Heriot's		
Provincial / State sides
Years	Team	Apps	(Points)
1962	Edinburgh District		
1962-63	Whites Trial		
1966	Cities District		
1967	Scottish Districts		
International career
Years	Team	Apps	(Points)
1963-69	Scotland	8	(15)

Colin Blaikie (born 21 November 1941) is a former Scotland international rugby union player.

== Rugby Union career ==
=== Amateur career ===
He played for Heriot's.

=== Provincial career ===
He played for Edinburgh District. He was part of the Edinburgh side that won the 1962–63 Scottish Inter-District Championship, scoring in every match - and part of the Edinburgh side that beat Canada that same season.

He played for the Whites Trial side in their matches against the Blues Trial to determine international selection. He turned out for Whites in their 2nd trial match in 1962-63 season.

He played for the Cities District in 1966 in their match against Australia. Australia won 18–11.

He played for the combined Scottish Districts side in their match against New Zealand in 1967. The combined side lost 35–14, although at one point Blaikie's conversion had the Scottish Districts side winning 11–10.

=== International career ===
He played for Scotland from 1963 to 1969.

After his first two caps in 1963, he was ditched by Scotland. He was said to have only been picked when Scotland experimented by playing full back Ken Scotland at fly-half.

Returning to international duty in 1966, he was deemed the 'forgotten man' - and was only picked by the selectors then after Stewart Wilson pulled out of the squad with tonsilitis - but Blaikie made an impressive showing against England in Scotland's 6-3 Calcutta Cup win at Murrayfield that year. At the time, Blaikie was not first choice for Edinburgh District, nor had played in any Trial matches that season. The English press blamed their own fly half Mike Weston for the Calcutta Cup loss; saying his inaccurate tactial kicking 'made Blaikie look like a world-beater'.

Playing against Australia in 1968, it was said that he performed 'quietly and efficiently' in a 9–3 win for Scotland, and kicked two penalties in a swirling wind.

He kicked a 35-yard penalty that helped Scotland on the way to a 6–3 win over France in January 1969.

Although he was in the losing side in Scotland's match against Wales in February 1969 it was reported that Blaikie came through with his reputation 'untarnished'.

His last match for Scotland - against England at Twickenham in March 1969 - was deemed 'disastrous'. Blaikie failed to clear his lines and missed 3 kickable penalties. As a result, it was England that won the match 8–3.

He was in a Scotland XV select that later toured South Africa that year. It was reported that Blaikie had a great tour, and scored against an Argentine select side.

He remained in the Scotland reckoning for a couple of years after this; and was originally selected to face England at Twickenham again in 1971 (when Ian Smith was dropped), but injury prevented further caps.

== Family ==
His son Paul Blaikie was a golfer based in South Africa; but often played in Scotland's Amateur Championships.
