= Aberdeenshire RFC =

Scottish rugby union club, based in Aberdeen

(Scotland) Aberdeenshire Mens RFC
- Full name: Aberdeenshire Rugby Football Club
- Nickname: Shire
- Founded: 1875; 151 years ago
- Location: Woodside, Aberdeen, Scotland
- Ground: Woodside Sports Complex "The Fortress"
- President: Michael MacLugash
- Coach(es): Paul Harrow, Connor MacFarlane
- Captain(s): Paul Harrow and Chris Ballantyne
- League(s): Caledonia Region League Division 1 (Men's); Caledonia North One (Women's)
- 3rd of 16
Team kit

Official website
- www.aberdeenshirerfc.com
- Current season

Aberdeenshire RFC is a rugby union club based in Woodside, Aberdeen, Scotland. The Men's team currently plays in Caledonia Region League Division 1. The Women's team currently plays in Caledonia North Regional League Division 1.

== History ==
Aberdeenshire RFC was founded in 1875.

Aberdeenshire were early pioneers of Youth Rugby in the North East of Scotland. They were the first club in the area to establish a youth rugby team, in the 1960s.

The club has played in local and national level league structures, and has had up to three men's teams competing. The highest league position they have reached is National Two. They experienced a drop down in the leagues in 2017 following some managerial and financial difficulties. They have since recovered; so much so that they were nominated for Aberdeen Sports Club of the year in 2019, after winning the treble that season. This consisted of; winning the league, winning the regional bowl competition, and winning the national bowl competition with the final match held at Murrayfield.

== Sides ==
The club runs a men's side, a women's side known as Aberdeenshire Quines, a mixed touch rugby side known as Aberdeenshire Leopards and a youth team.

== Aberdeenshire Sevens ==
The club runs the Aberdeenshire Sevens tournament. Sides play for the W. Wilson Robertson Trophy.

== Honours ==
- Caledonia North League Three
  - Champions (1): 2018–19
- Caledonia North Bowl Competition
  - Champions (1): 2018–19
- National Bowl Competition
  - Champions (1): 2018–19
- Dundee HSFP Sevens
  - Champions (1): 1906
- Orkney Sevens
  - Champions (1): 1975
- Caithness Sevens
  - Champions (1): 1977
- Garioch Sevens
  - Champions (3): 1978, 1991, 2016
- Banff Sevens
  - Champions (2): 1999, 2015

== Notable former players ==
=== Scotland ===
The following former Aberdeenshire players have represented Scotland at international level.

| Ken Scotland | (Scotland) Gregor Sharp |

=== North and Midlands ===
The following former Aberdeenshire players have represented North and Midlands at provincial level.

| Ken Scotland | (Scotland) I. L. Robb | (Scotland) J. E. Snape |

Former rugby commentator Bill McLaren also played for the club.
