= Caesar (Massie novel) =

1993 novel by Allan Massie

- First edition
- Author: Allan Massie
- Language: English
- Genre: Historical novel
- Publisher: Hodder & Stoughton
- Publication date: 1993
- Publication place: United Kingdom
- Media type: Print (hardback & paperback)
- ISBN: 0340487895
- Preceded by: The Sins of the Father
- Followed by: The Ragged Lion

Caesar is a 1993 historical novel by Scottish writer Allan Massie, the third in the author's series of novels about the early Roman Emperors.

== Synopsis ==
It is written as the memoirs of Decimus Brutus, one of Caesar’s assassins, in custody, awaiting judgement and almost certain death for his part in the slaying. Brutus insists that he has no need to make an apology and sets out his reasons clearly and succinctly, celebrating the charmed life of Caesar though tempering his remarkable achievements with the great man’s overpowering ambition and ruthless determination to end the Roman Republic and install himself as Dictator for life. As he writes in hindsight of the unfolding conspiracy, Brutus paints himself as a patriot, willing to destroy his own life and the legacy of his ancient family name to prevent Caesar from carrying out the unthinkable and ending over 500 years of republicanism.
