= Frans ten Bos =

Scotland international rugby union player

- Born: 21 April 1937 Richmond, England
- Died: 1 September 2016 (aged 79) Dundee
- School: Lathallan School; Fettes College
- University: University of Oxford
- Occupation(s): former Chairman of Henderson Strata and WACE

Rugby union career
- Position: Lock
Amateur team(s)
Years	Team	Apps	(Points)
- London Scottish FC
–	Oxford University RFC		
–	Anglo-Scots		
- Correct as of 15 November 2009
International career
Years	Team	Apps	(Points)
1959–1963	Scotland	17	(3)
- Correct as of 15 November 2009

Frans Herman ten Bos (21 April 1937 – 1 September 2016) was a Scottish rugby union footballer. He played for Scotland as a lock in the 1960s, and was capped seventeen times.

== Early life ==
Ten Bos was born in Richmond, England to Dutch parents, who returned to the Netherlands when he was a child. The German invasion of the Netherlands caused the family to flee to Scotland, via France and West Africa. He was raised in Glasgow, Argyll, and then Elie in Fife. He went to Lathallan School, where he was introduced to rugby, followed by Fettes College

== Rugby career ==
After leaving school, Ten Bos played for Oxford University RFC and London Scottish FC.

Ten Bos was controversially dropped before the Scotland-Ireland game in Dublin in 1960, because he was recovering from an injury. Yet according to Bill McLaren, "he took part in all the preparatory activities and pronounced himself as fit to play. He certainly gave it 100 per cent during a vigorous session." Yet Alf Wilson, chairman of the selectors, did not think so, and he was replaced by Oliver Grant of Hawick. McLaren continues: "there was a feeling that ten Bos had been unfairly treated and that the lad himself was hurt and distressed by the decision to leave him out."

Notably, ten Bos scored a try against Wales in Cardiff, in the 1962 match there, which resulted in Scotland's first victory against Wales in an away game in thirty five years; the score was 8-3 to Scotland.

A famous story involving ten Bos and Hugh McLeod is told by Bill McLaren. On the evening before the 1963 game between Scotland and France at Colombes in Paris, Hugh McLeod and Bill McLaren were out having a meal together and bumped into ten Bos near a cafe. Hugh McLeod took Ten Bos aside, and told him bluntly:

"Frans, ye think ye're a guid forrit [forward] but really ye're jist a big lump o' potted meat. If ah was half yer size I'd pick up the first two Frenchman that looked at me the morn [tomorrow] and ah'd chuck them right ower the bloody stand."

Scotland later won the game 11-6, rare for an away game.

Ten Bos tapped McLaren on the shoulder as they left the cafe, and said, "You know, I'd follow him anywhere."

== Later life ==
He later became Chairman of Henderson Strata Investments.

He is profiled in the August, 1973 edition of Rugby World.

He died on 1 September 2016 at the age of 79.

== References and sources ==
=== Printed and Electronic Sources ===
- McLaren, Bill Talking of Rugby (1991, Stanley Paul, London ISBN 0-09-173875-X),
- Massie, Allan A Portrait of Scottish Rugby (Polygon, Edinburgh; ISBN 0-904919-84-6)
- Distinguished Pupils on Fettes.com
