= Borth Todd =

Scotland international rugby union player

- Born: Hugh Borthwick Todd; 28 October 1888 Innerleithen, Scotland
- Died: 2 June 1945 (aged 56) Galashiels, Scotland

Rugby union career
- Position: Fly half
Amateur team(s)
Years	Team	Apps	(Points)
- Gala
Provincial / State sides
Years	Team	Apps	(Points)
1910	South of Scotland		
1912	Combined Scottish Districts		
1913	Borders XV		
International career
Years	Team	Apps	(Points)
1911	Scotland	1	(0)

Borth Todd (28 October 1888 – 31 December 1962) was a Scotland international rugby union player. He played as a Fly half.

== Rugby Union career ==
=== Amateur career ===
Todd played for Gala, usually playing at Fly half and sometimes Inside Centre. He was to become club captain.

=== Provincial career ===
Todd played for the South of Scotland in 1910.

The first outing of the Combined Scottish Districts was originally deemed a 'Glasgow and Districts' line-up, despite players from all around Scotland actually outnumbering those from Glasgow District. Todd played for the combined district side on 27 November 1912 against South Africa.

Todd also played for a Borders XV against Glasgow Academicals in December 1913; missing out on selection for the South versus North match the same day.

=== International career ===
Todd was capped just the once for Scotland in 1911. Although he normally played at Fly half or Inside Centre for Gala, he was capped playing Full Back.

=== Administrative career ===
In 1937 Todd was made President of Gala. A year later the club made him a life member.

== Cricket career ==
Todd was noted as a hard hitting batsman. He played cricket for Gala cricket club.
