= Martin Scott (rugby union) =

Scotland international rugby union player

- Born: Martin William Scott; 5 July 1966 (age 60) Falkirk, Scotland
- Height: 1.82 m (6 ft 0 in)
- Weight: 100 kg (15 st 10 lb; 220 lb)

Rugby union career
- Position: Hooker
Amateur team(s)
Years	Team	Apps	(Points)
- Dunfermline
–	Edinburgh Academicals		
Senior career
Years	Team	Apps	(Points)
1995-96	Orrell		
Provincial / State sides
Years	Team	Apps	(Points)
- North and Midlands
-	Combined Scottish Districts		
International career
Years	Team	Apps	(Points)
1991-92	Scotland 'B'	2	(0)
1992	Scotland	1	(0)
1993-95	Scotland 'A'	2	(0)

Martin Scott (born 5 July 1966) is a former Scotland international rugby union player.

== Rugby Union career ==
=== Amateur career ===
He played for Dunfermline.

He then moved to play for Edinburgh Academicals.

=== Provincial and professional career ===
He was capped by North and Midlands.

When the game turned professional, he played for Orrell in England.

He played for the Combined Scottish Districts side in 1996.

=== International career ===
He was capped twice by Scotland 'B', playing against Ireland 'B' at the end of 1991, and against France 'B' in 1992 - which proved the 'B' side's last match.

He received his first full senior cap in 1992 against Australia. It proved his only full cap.

He was capped twice by Scotland 'A' from 1993 to 1995.
