= William Purvis =

William Purvis may refer to:

- Will Purvis (1872–1938), exonerated American suspect
- William Purvis (Blind Willie) (1752–1832), British blind singer-songwriter
- Billy Purvis (1853) (1784–1853), British entertainer and showman
- William H. Purvis (1858–1950), Hawaiian planter
- William Purvis (French horn player) (born 1948), French horn player and conductor
- William B. Purvis (1838–1914), black inventor and businessman

== See also ==
- William Purves (disambiguation)
