= David Gilbert-Smith =

Scotland international rugby union player

- Born: David Stuart Gilbert-Smith; 3 December 1931 Pune, British India
- Died: 24 March 2003 (aged 71) Cheltenham, England
- School: St Edward's School, Oxford

Rugby union career
- Position: Flanker
Amateur team(s)
Years	Team	Apps	(Points)
- London Scottish
–	Army Rugby Union		
–	Gloucester RFC		
International career
Years	Team	Apps	(Points)
1952	Scotland	1	(0)

David Gilbert-Smith, MC (3 December 1931 – 24 March 2003) was a Scotland international rugby union footballer and a British Army officer. Gilbert-Smith played as a flanker.

== Rugby union career ==
=== Amateur career ===
Gilbert-Smith played for London Scottish. He also played for the Army Rugby Union side and played 17 games for Gloucester between 1961 and 1963.

=== International career ===
Gilbert-Smith was capped for Scotland once, in 1952, in the Five Nations Calcutta Cup match against England.

== Army career ==
Gilbert-Smith joined the British Army in 1951. He won the Military Cross as a result of his bravery when with the Duke of Wellington's Regiment in the Battle of the Hook in Korea in 1953. He fought in the battle alongside another Scotland international rugby player, Mike Campbell-Lamerton. The two became lifelong friends.

Gilbert-Smith also served in the Special Air Service (SAS).

== Business career ==
Gilbert-Smith subsequently worked as a Training Manager for Bulmers. He later founded the Leadership Trust in 1975, working with Janet Richardson, a behavioural psychologist, whom he married in 1985.
