= George Stevenson (rugby union) =

Scotland international rugby union player

- Born: George Drummond Stevenson; 30 May 1933 Hawick, Scotland
- Died: 24 October 2012 (aged 79) Currie, Scotland
- Height: 6 ft 2 in (1.88 m)

Rugby union career
- Position: Centre
Amateur team(s)
Years	Team	Apps	(Points)
- Hawick PSA
- Hawick Linden
1951-67	Hawick		
Provincial / State sides
Years	Team	Apps	(Points)
- South of Scotland District
1965	Scottish Districts	1	(3)
International career
Years	Team	Apps	(Points)
1956-65	Scotland	24	(9)

George Stevenson (30 May 1933 – 24 June 2012) was a Scotland international rugby union player. He played as a Centre, but could also cover Wing.

== Rugby Union career ==
=== Amateur career ===
Stevenson started playing rugby union with Hawick PSA and then moved to Hawick Linden.

From Linden, Stevenson then played for Hawick.

His Hawick team-mate Hugh McLeod said this of Stevenson: "He was a like car. He had gears and he would move into top gear when he thought it was necessary. He was never happy touching the ball down in the corner. He would always want to touch down under the posts. He was such a character."

=== Provincial career ===
He played for South of Scotland District.

He also played for the combined Scottish Districts side, notably in their 1965 match against the touring South Africa international side. Scoring a side-stepping try against the Springboks he helped the Scottish Districts side record a 16-8 win.

The Border Telegraph notes: "Everyone in Hawick that day knew that "Stevie" would sidestep because that was his routine in club colours. The only exception was the poor Springbok defender who was completely bamboozled."

The Glasgow Herald noted the try as a 'spectacular solo try'.

=== International career ===
He was capped 24 times for Scotland. He scored a try on his debut against England.

He played for Barbarians.

== Business career ==
He trained to be an engineer but after his national service switched to working in food and drink production. He worked in Bibby's, an agricultural foodstuffs production before switching to be a representative for Ballantine's whisky.
