= Ken Scotland =

Scottish rugby union player and cricketer (1936–2023)

- Born: Kenneth James Forbes Scotland; 29 August 1936 Warriston, Edinburgh, Scotland
- Died: 7 January 2023 (aged 86) Edinburgh, Scotland
- School: George Heriot's School
- University: Cambridge University

Rugby union career
- Position: Fullback
Amateur team(s)
Years	Team	Apps	(Points)
1957-60	Cambridge University	60	
1961-63	Leicester Tigers	40	
1963-69	Aberdeenshire RFC	89	
Provincial / State sides
Years	Team	Apps	(Points)
1963-69	North and Midlands	23	
International career
Years	Team	Apps	(Points)
1957–1965	Scotland	27	(79)
1959	British and Irish Lions	22	(72)
- Correct as of 30 September 2020

Kenneth James Forbes Scotland (29 August 1936 – 7 January 2023) was a Scotland international rugby union player and a Scotland international cricket player. He played at full-back in rugby union.

== Rugby Union career ==
=== Amateur career ===
Scotland was educated at George Heriot's School, Edinburgh, and Trinity College, Cambridge, where he read history and economics after completing two years National Service with the Royal Signals at Catterick Garrison (and where he played 13 times for the Army as well as for other army representative sides). Having struggled with the Latin component of his Cambridge entrance exam, he then ran into further trouble when he had a disastrous trial for Cambridge University R.U.F.C., and it was claimed he lost his form all that autumn and as a result was only third choice for the university, despite being first choice full back for the Scottish team. An injury to Robin Chisholm brought him back onto the Scotland team, and he played for another five seasons without discussion. Because he took a term out from university to play for the British and Irish Lions in Australia and New Zealand he was required to stay an extra term to complete his degree. Gordon Waddell was one of his more famous teammates at Cambridge.

After graduating from Cambridge, Scotland's career took him to work in Tamworth, he joined Leicester Tigers, making his debut against Bath in September 1961. In his first season, despite international callups limiting his availability, he was the club's top point scorer with 138 from 24 games. In 1963, work took Scotland to Edinburgh and he left Leicester after 40 games and 240 points. On 1 November 1999, Scotland was named in the Tigers' "Team of the Century", despite only playing 40 games in 18 months for the club.

=== Provincial career ===
After moving to Aberdeen, Ken Scotland played for Aberdeenshire, and for the North and Midlands district team. According to his autobiography he played for 34 different teams. These included London Scottish FC, Heriot's FP and Ballymena.

=== International career ===
Scotland played for Scotland 27 times between 1957 and 1965, and 22 times for the British Lions on their 1959 tour of New Zealand.

Scotland was originally picked for the match against France, while doing his National Service in the Army, and scored the only points in the match, a drop goal and a penalty.

Richard Bath writes of him that:

"Like Gavin Hastings against France nearly three decades later, Ken Scotland started his international career on a high note, scoring all six points in his country's win over France. Yet although Scotland made a huge impact when he won his first cap aged 19, it could all have been so different. Until circumstances caused his selection at full-back at for the Scottish Trial earlier that year, Scotland had always played fly-half. That experience of playing fly-half added another dimension to his game, and he soon emerged as the first true attacking full-back in an age where a safety-first attitude and a large boot were the most important attributes for any No. 15... Novel at the time, it is now the staple diet of attacking full-backs the world over."

Scotland's goal kicking style was highly influential:

"As a goal kicker he popularized the instep style, then deplored by most coaches, now adopted by most kickers... His record as a goal-kicker hardly compares with Andy Irvine, but then the modern ball flies further and truer."

But on the other hand, Scotland missed three penalty kicks against England in the 1962 Calcutta Cup match.

== Cricket career ==
Scotland also played for the Scottish national cricket team. He played one first-class match for Scotland, against Ireland in 1958, scoring no runs in his only innings and not bowling.

== Tributes ==
Scotland was said to revolutionise the position of full back in rugby union, by popularising strike running from that position. He was to make the full back role a glamour rugby union position. He would join back line moves to create an extra man in attack.

The Offside Line writes:

He was a physically slight man by the standards of modern professional rugby players, but a giant of the game on a global level during his pomp in the late 1950s and early 1960s, creating a legacy which has endured to this day. Before [Ken] Scotland, full-backs attacked from deep off kicked ball, but he helped revolutionise the position as one of the first of the breed to join the back-line as a strike-runner.

The modest and softly-spoken Scotland was an unlikely rugby revolutionary, and his role in glamourising the full-back position had a lot to do with circumstance. Having played almost all his rugby at stand-off up until being selected at full-back in the second national trial ahead of the 1957 Five Nations, he found himself deployed at a high level in a position he was not really familiar with, and his background compelled him to push forward more than his predecessors in that role would ever have dreamed of. It should be said that the conviction with which he embraced the new role reflected a steely determination and powerful competitive instinct which was not apparent in his off-field demeanour.

Tom Kiernan was being interviewed on the occasion of his fiftieth cap for Ireland, and was asked who he thought was the greatest rugby player of his time, and replied,:"Ken Scotland. It was a privilege to be on the same field as him." Arthur Smith called him "the best passer of a ball I played with."

Allan Massie (who attended Trinity College, Cambridge, at the same time as Scotland) puts him in a class with Jackie Kyle, Mike Gibson and Barry John, and says:

"His sense of position was very fine, sometimes uncanny; it was very rare to see him caught out, and he played in the days when full-backs received even more bombardment than they do now... He kicked beautifully with either foot. His tackling, though not destructive in the Bruce Hay manner, for he was slim and light of build, was very safe. I recall vividly one try-saving tackle in 1961 on the Welsh winger Dewi Bebb; it could have been used to illustrate a textbook and carried Bebb well into touch.

"He was first full-back fully to exploit the attacking possibilities of the game. He wasn't of course the first to refuse to be restricted to a fielding, tackling and kicking role, but not even the great New Zealander Bob Scott had brought the same spirit of intelligent adventure to the position."

== Later life and death ==
Ken Scotland published his autobiography in 2020. He died from cancer on 7 January 2023, at the age of 86.

== See also ==
- List of Scottish cricket and rugby union players
