= 1912–13 Scottish Districts season =

Rugby union competition

- Countries: Scotland
- Date: 1912–13
- Matches played: 1

The 1912–13 Scottish Districts season is a record of all the rugby union matches for Scotland's district teams.

== History ==
Edinburgh District beat Glasgow District in the Inter-City match

== Results ==
Date	Try	Conversion	Penalty	Dropped goal	Goal from mark	Notes
1905–1947	3 points	2 points	3 points	4 points	3 points	

=== Inter-City ===
7 December 1912

Glasgow District	6 - 13	Edinburgh District
	Report

New Anniesland, Glasgow

Glasgow District:
Edinburgh District:

=== Trial matches ===
21 December 1912

Blues Trial	27 - 8	Whites Trial
	Preview; Report

Inverleith

Blues Trial:
Whites Trial:

18 January 1913

Scotland Probables	15 - 6	Scotland Possibles
	Preview; Report

Scotland Probables:
Scotland Possibles:

=== English matches ===
No other District matches played.

=== International matches ===
27 November 1912

Combined Scottish Districts	6 - 13	South Africa
	Report

New Anniesland, Glasgow

Combined Scottish Districts:
South Africa:
