= Augustus (Massie novel) =

1986 novel by Allan Massie

- First edition
- Author: Allan Massie
- Language: English
- Genre: Historical novel
- Publisher: Bodley Head
- Publication date: 1986
- Publication place: United Kingdom
- Media type: Print (hardback & paperback)
- ISBN: 978-0-340-41224-4
- Preceded by: One Night in Winter
- Followed by: 101 Great Scots

Augustus is a 1986 historical novel by Scottish writer Allan Massie, the first of a highly regarded series of novels about the movers and makers of Imperial Rome. Massie begins with Augustus, the successor to Julius Caesar, who ruled the Roman Empire for forty one years and oversaw the beginnings of an extended peace, the Pax Romana.

== Synopsis ==
The novel is in the form of a memoir written by Augustus in old age, in which he looks back over his long reign. Massie uses modern language and phraseology to describe Augustus' ruthlessness and the political intrigue he mastered and used so capably to keep himself in power for so many years when for most of his rule he was surrounded by powerful enemies and duplicitous allies.
