= Derrick Grant =

Scotland international rugby union player (1938–2024)

- Born: 19 April 1938 Hawick, Scottish Borders, Scotland
- Died: 10 November 2024 (aged 86)

Rugby union career
- Position: Flanker
Amateur team(s)
Years	Team	Apps	(Points)
- Hawick RFC
International career
Years	Team	Apps	(Points)
1965–1968	Scotland	14	(3)

Derrick Grant (19 April 1938 – 10 November 2024) was a Scotland international rugby union player and coach.

== Biography ==
Grant was born in Hawick, Scottish Borders on 19 April 1938. He was capped fourteen times as a flanker for Scotland between 1965 and 1968. He scored one try for Scotland. He was selected for the 1966 British Lions tour to Australia and New Zealand but did not play in any of the internationals.

Grant also played club rugby for Hawick RFC. He was Hawick's most successful ever coach in the 1970s and 1980s coaching Hawick to five division 1 championships in a row. He also coached the Scotland team during the 1980s.

His brother was another Scotland cap, Oliver Grant. Derrick Grant died on 10 November 2024, at the age of 86.
