= Brian Simmers =

Scotland international rugby union player

- Born: Brian Maxwell Simmers; 26 February 1940 (age 86) Glasgow, Scotland

Rugby union career
- Position: Centre
Amateur team(s)
Years	Team	Apps	(Points)
- Glasgow Academicals
Provincial / State sides
Years	Team	Apps	(Points)
- Glasgow District
International career
Years	Team	Apps	(Points)
1965-71	Scotland	7	(9)

Brian Maxwell Simmers (born 26 February 1940, Glasgow) is a former Scotland international rugby union player.

== Rugby Union career ==
=== Amateur career ===
He played for Glasgow Academicals.

=== Provincial career ===
He played for Glasgow District in the Scottish Inter-District Championship.

=== International career ===
He was capped seven times between 1967 and 1971 for Scotland.

== Family ==
He was the son of Bill "Max" Simmers, who was also capped for Scotland. and tennis player Gwen Sterry. His grandmother was Charlotte Cooper who won five women's singles titles at the Wimbledon Championships and two gold medals at the 1900 Summer Olympics.
