= Alex Purves =

Scotland international rugby union player

Alexander Purves was a Scottish rugby union player.

He was capped ten times for Scotland between 1906 and 1908. He also played for London Scottish FC.

He was the brother of William Purves who was also capped for Scotland.
