= Oliver Grant (rugby union) =

Scottish rugby union player (1933–2022)

- Born: Thomas Oliver Grant; 5 September 1933
- Died: June 2022 (aged 88)

Rugby union career
- Position: No. 8
Amateur team(s)
Years	Team	Apps	(Points)
- Hawick
Provincial / State sides
Years	Team	Apps	(Points)
- Scottish Border XV
-	South of Scotland		
-	Provinces District		
–	Blues Trial		
International career
Years	Team	Apps	(Points)
1960-64	Scotland	6	

Thomas Oliver Grant (5 September 1933 – June 2022) was a Scotland international rugby union player.

== Rugby Union career ==
=== Amateur career ===
Grant played for Hawick.

=== Provincial career ===
Grant played for the Scottish Border XV in their match against Royal Air Force Rugby Union in 1962.

He played for South of Scotland.

Grant played for Provinces District - the combined north–south side - in their match against Canada on 28 November 1962.

He played for Blues Trial in the 3rd and last trial match of the 1962-63 season; the Blues edging a 23–20 win over Whites Trial.

=== International career ===
Grant was capped for Scotland six times between 1960 and 1964.

== Personal life and death ==
Oliver Grant died in June 2022, at the age of 88.

His late, younger brother Derrick Grant was also capped for Scotland.
