= Robin Chisholm =

Scotland international rugby union player

- Born: Robin Chisholm; 16 October 1929
- Died: 2 November 1991 (aged 62)
- Notable relative: David Chisholm (brother)

Rugby union career
Amateur team(s)
| Years | Team | Apps | (Points) |
- Melrose RFC
Provincial / State sides
| Years | Team | Apps | (Points) |
- South of Scotland
International career
| Years | Team | Apps | (Points) |
| 1955-1960 | Scotland | 11 | |

Robin Chisholm (16 October 1929 – 2 November 1991) was a Scottish international rugby union player.

He was capped for Scotland eleven times between 1955 and 1960. He also played for Melrose RFC.

His brother David Chisholm was also capped for Scotland.
