= William Purves (rugby union) =

Scotland international rugby union player

- Born: William Donald Campbell Laidlaw Purves; 4 July 1888 London, England
- Died: 19 September 1964 (aged 76) Banbury, England
- Notable relative(s): Alex Purves, brother

Rugby union career
- Position: Lock
Amateur team(s)
Years	Team	Apps	(Points)
- Cambridge University
–	London Scottish		
Provincial / State sides
Years	Team	Apps	(Points)
1908	Anglo-Scots		
1912	Whites Trial		
1913	Blues Trial		
International career
Years	Team	Apps	(Points)
1912–13	Scotland	6	(3)
- Correct as of 11 July 2021

William Purves (4 July 1888 – 18 September 1964) was a Scotland international rugby union player.

== Rugby Union career ==
=== Amateur career ===
He played for Cambridge University.

He played for London Scottish.

=== Provincial career ===
He played for Anglo-Scots district against Provinces District on 26 December 1908, while still with Cambridge University.

He played for Whites Trial against Blues Trial on 6 January 1912.

He played for Blues Trial against Whites Trial on 18 January 1913.

=== International career ===
He was capped six times for Scotland between 1912 and 1913.

== Family ==
He was the brother of Alex Purves who was also capped for Scotland.
