= David Rollo (rugby union) =

British Lions & Scotland international rugby union player

- Born: David Miller Durie Rollo; 7 July 1934 (age 92) Fife, Scotland
- Height: 5 ft 11 in (180 cm)
- Weight: 14 st 7 lb (203 lb; 92 kg)
- School: Bell Baxter High School
- Occupation: Farmer

Rugby union career
- Position: Prop
Amateur team(s)
Years	Team	Apps	(Points)
- Howe of Fife
–	Barbarians		
- Correct as of 15 November 2009
Provincial / State sides
Years	Team	Apps	(Points)
- North and Midlands
-	Blues Trial		
International career
Years	Team	Apps	(Points)
1959-1968	Scotland	40	(0)
1962	British and Irish Lions	0	(0)

David Miller Durie Rollo (born 7 July 1934) is a former Scotland international rugby union player. He played as a prop forward.

== Rugby Union career ==
=== Amateur career ===
Rollo went to Bell Baxter High School in Cupar, and continues to support their rugby team. However, while at school, he preferred football.

Rollo played for Howe of Fife R.F.C. until he was 40.

As a prop, Rollo could play both tight and loosehead:

"the Fife farmer who always played with his stockings rolled down to his ankles, was strong and skilful enough to play on either side of the scrum."

=== Provincial career ===
Rollo played for North and Midlands in the Scottish Inter-District Championship.

Rollo was in the first two Blues Trial side matches against Whites Trial in 1962-63, scoring a try in each game and helping secure the Blues win in both matches.

=== International career ===
Rollo played 40 times for Scotland.

Allan Massie includes Rollo in his All-Time XV's reserves, saying "Rollo's ability to play on either side of the scrum would make him a natural member of the squad".

Bill McLaren witnessed Rollo's international debut, at the 1959 Calcutta Cup game

"That 1959 match, at which I shared the radio commentary was quite distinctive for the courage shown by the Fife farmer, David Rollo who was gaining his first cap out of the Howe of Fife club. Soon after the start David suffered a broken nose, but after a brief absence for repairs, he returned to play prop with undiminished fire. After that debut it hardly was surprising that David went on to gain 40 caps."
