= Bill Hunter (journalist) =

American crime reporter (1928–1964)

- Born: William Bradley Hunter; November 2, 1928; Wichita Falls, Texas, U.S.
- Died: April 23, 1964 (aged 35); Long Beach, California, U.S.
- Cause of death: Gunshot wound
- Resting place: Restland Memorial Park
- Occupation: Crime reporter
- Notable work: "Three Days in Dallas"

William Bradley Hunter (November 2, 1928 – April 23, 1964) was an American crime reporter for the Long Beach, California Independent Press-Telegram. Hunter's 16-page special on the assassination of John F. Kennedy and the shooting of Lee Harvey Oswald by Jack Ruby, "Three Days in Dallas", was awarded the 1964 "Spot News Reporting" award of the California Newspaper Publishers Association's "Better Newspaper Contest".

A native of Wichita Falls, Texas, Hunter had previously worked as a court reporter there for five years before becoming a crime reporter. On March 22, 1964, Hunter wrote a story for the Press-Telegram saying that Oswald had "assuredly" killed Kennedy.

== Death ==
On April 23, 1964, at around 2 am, Hunter was fatally shot while sitting at his desk in the press room at the Long Beach police headquarters by police officer, Creighton Wiggins. Wiggins initially claimed that his gun accidentally discharged when he dropped it on the floor, hitting Hunter in the heart as he sat reading a book. Hunter was killed instantly. After investigators concluded that the trajectory of the bullet was not consistent with a gun that was at ground level, Wiggins changed his story and said he had been playing "quick draw" with a fellow officer, Errol Greenleaf, and had fired his gun accidentally. Wiggins and Greenleaf, who said his back was turned at the time, were convicted of involuntary manslaughter and received three-year probation sentences. Hunter is interred at Restland Memorial Park in Dallas.

In 1991, George Robeson, a fellow Press-Telegram columnist, stated that gun-play between reporters and Long Beach officers was a fairly common occurrence. Robeson said, "Guns had been shoved in my ribs more than once. It was childish and terribly dangerous fun, and finally fatal. The only surprise is that it hadn't happened before." Nonetheless, Hunter's death is considered suspicious by some researchers pursuing John F. Kennedy assassination conspiracy theories, as Jim Koethe (a reporter who went to Ruby's apartment with Hunter the night after Ruby shot Oswald) also died of homicide in 1964. (Note: There were three reporters taking part in the meeting in Ruby's apartment. While two of them died of separate homicides the next year, the third one, William "Willie" Allen (known for his photos from Dealey Plaza), was still alive decades later. Besides the reporters, Ruby's roommate George Senator was present, along with three lawyers who had previously worked for Ruby. One of these lawyers, Tom Howard, also died within two years of the meeting, but reportedly of a heart attack (he was 48).)
