= Billy Hunter (rugby union) =

Scotland international rugby union player

- Born: William John Ferguson Hunter; 5 June 1934 Hawick, Scotland
- Died: 20 September 2016 (aged 82) Hawick, Scotland
- Height: 6 ft 4 in (1.93 m)
- Weight: 100.5 kg (15 st 12 lb)

Rugby union career
- Position: Lock
Amateur team(s)
Years	Team	Apps	(Points)
- Hawick PSA
- Hawick Linden
1952-	Hawick		
Provincial / State sides
Years	Team	Apps	(Points)
1958	Scottish Border XV		
1962	South of Scotland District		
1962	Provinces District		
1962-63	Whites Trial		
International career
Years	Team	Apps	(Points)
1964-67	Scotland	7	(0)
–	Barbarians		

Billy Hunter (5 June 1934 – 20 September 2016) was a Scotland international rugby union player. He played as a lock.

== Rugby Union career ==
=== Amateur career ===
He played rugby for Hawick High School before joining Hawick PSA and then Hawick Linden.

Hunter then joined and played for Hawick from 1952.

He went on to captain the side.

=== Provincial career ===
He first represented the Scottish Border XV in their match against Scottish Universities in 1958.

He played for South of Scotland District. He was part of the South side that beat Australia.

He was part of the North-South Provinces District side that beat Canada in 1962, scoring a try in the match.

He played for the Whites Trial side in their matches against the Blues Trial to determine international selection. He turned out for Whites in their 1st and 3rd trial matches in 1962-63 season.

=== International career ===
He was capped 7 times for Scotland. He was part of the Scotland side that drew 0-0 with New Zealand.

He played for Barbarians.

== Business career ==
Hunter first worked in the local 'skinyards' which took raw sheepskins and prepared them for use in the woollen mills. Coupling his work there with rugby training proved problematic - and Jim Renwick recalled: "Billy was always turning up late for training and [the trainer] Hugh McLeod wasn’t best pleased. Billy protested one night that he was working at the skinworks and finished at 6pm and with training starting at half past he struggled to get down in time for the start. Well, the next day he gets home from work and there’s a bike at his door."

He moved on from the skinworks to become a manager of a slaughterhouse. Later he ran his own business running kennels and breeding dogs.

== Other interests ==
He took up golf and had a single-figure handicap. He often played with Bill McLaren.

He bred canaries to a national standard, and won Scottish titles.

He participated in the Hawick Common Riding. In 2013 he was proud to see his son Stuart become the 'acting father' to the Cornet Ritson.

He was regularly found supporting the Hawick side as a fan, together with his friend Harry Whittaker, the former Hawick scrum-half.
