= Ian McCrae (rugby union) =

Scottish rugby union player (1941–2026)

- Born: Ian George McCrae; 19 May 1941 Aberdeen, Scotland
- Died: 7 January 2026 (aged 84)

Rugby union career
- Position: Scrum half
Amateur team(s)
Years	Team	Apps	(Points)
- Gordonians
Provincial / State sides
Years	Team	Apps	(Points)
- North of Scotland District
- North and Midlands
International career
Years	Team	Apps	(Points)
1967–1972	Scotland	6	(0)

Ian George McCrae (19 May 1941 – 7 January 2026) was a Scottish international rugby union player. He played at Scrum half.

== Rugby union career ==
=== Amateur career ===
McCrae played for Gordonians. He played for the club for 4 different decades from 1959 to the 1980s.

=== Provincial career ===
McCrae played for North of Scotland District and North and Midlands.

=== International career ===
McCrae played for Scotland 6 times between 1967 and 1972.

He was the first permitted substitute in international rugby union.

== Death ==
McCrae died on 7 January 2026, at the age of 84. His funeral was held on 22 January.
