= Bill Hunter (businessman) =

- Born: William Hunter; 1938
- Died: 1 March 2023; Perth, Scotland
- Occupation: Businessman

Bill Hunter (1938 - 1 March 2023) was a Scottish businessman and the previous owner of professional football club Livingston.

== Career ==
Hunter was a self-made businessman who ran several businesses, including building companies, restaurants and public houses.

Whilst chairman of Meadowbank Thistle in the mid 90's, Hunter claimed the club had run into severe financial difficulties and were facing the possibility of going out of business. Despite opposition from many Meadowbank fans who objected to changing the club name and relocating from Edinburgh, in 1995 Meadowbank Thistle relocated to a new stadium in the new town of Livingston and changed name to Livingston Football Club.

He remained in his role as chairman of the club for three years following the relocation to Livingston, before selling to Glasgow businessman and ex Celtic director Dominic Keane in 1998.

== Personal life and death ==
Hunter was married to wife Barbara and had one daughter, Catherine.

He died on 1 March 2023 in Perth after a long illness.
