= Hugh McLeod (rugby union) =

British Lions & Scotland international rugby union player

- Born: Hugh Ferns McLeod; 8 June 1932 Hawick, Scotland
- Died: 12 May 2014 (aged 81) Hawick, Scotland
- Height: 5 ft 9 in (1.75 m)
- Weight: 15 st 10 lb (100 kg; 220 lb)

Rugby union career
- Position: Prop
Amateur team(s)
Years	Team	Apps	(Points)
- Hawick RFC
- Correct as of 15 November 2009
International career
Years	Team	Apps	(Points)
1954–1962	Scotland	40	
1954–1959	Barbarians		
1955	British & Irish Lions		
- Correct as of 15 November 2009

Hugh Ferns McLeod OBE (8 June 1932 – 12 May 2014) was a Scottish rugby union player, who played 40 times for Scotland between 1954 and 1962. He played 14 times for the Barbarians between 1954 and 1959, scoring only once, a try in their 1958 match against East Africa in Nairobi on 28 May 1958 (though this is erroneously listed on the Barbarian website as earning 5 points whereas a try was only worth 3 points at the time). His home team was Hawick RFC. giving rise to his nickname, the Hawick Hardman. Allan Massie describes him as "Hawick through and through, and is indeed now President of the Club".

== International career ==
Hugh McLeod propped alongside Tom Elliot of Gala RFC and David Rollo of Howe of Fife RFC. He was only 21 when he first played for Scotland, a young age at the time, and retired from international rugby at 30. He was made pack leader for a while, and the story goes that some of the posher, or anglified players could not actually understand his accent; one of his semi-humorous phrases as pack leader was "Come here, my wee disciples."

In 1955 he took part in the British Lions tour of South Africa and afterwards published his diary of the tour (Hugh McLeod Diary - The British Lions Rugby Tour of South Africa 1955). In 1959 he played on the 1959 British Lions tour to Australia and New Zealand.

Richard Bath writes of McLeod that he

"proved himself one of the best tight-forwards that Scotland has ever produced. Despite being only 5ft. 9in. tall and weighing in around 14 stone - McLeod was a fitness fanatic and mighty scrummager as well as a player of surprising pace who made a huge contribution in the loose. After beginning his rugby career at the age of 16, it was less than a year before McLeod was drafted into the Hawick first-team pack, then one of the mightiest forward units in Britain. Within four years, and only just out of his teens, he made his Test debut against the New Zealanders - a 3-0 defeat at Murrayfield."

Allan Massie is equally flattering:

"He was short, broad-shouldered and huge-thighed, rather harder than teak, but a scrupulous and utterly honest player. Superlatives exhausted themselves on him quickly, for the fact that technically he did everything right. The merit of his front-row play may be gauged by the fact that the Scotland pack in his time held its own in the tight, despite a lack of real weight and strength in the second row..."

He was a personal friend of Bill McLaren, also from Hawick, who describes him as "A man for whom I always have had the highest respect and admiration."

"come here, my wee disciples. Now, ah want tae tell ee that ah've been asked ti lead this pack tomorrow, that ah'm no very keen on the job and if any of you lot want to be pack-leader, just let me know, and ah'll put a word in for you at the right place. Meanwhile, the next one who opens his trap will get my boot bloody hard at his arse."

One of the Anglo-Scots is supposed to have said, "Well, I didn't understand a word of that but it all sounded damned impressive.".

Another famous story involving McLeod, and the lock Frans ten Bos and is told by Bill McLaren. On the evening before the 1963 game between Scotland and France at Colombes in Paris, Hugh McLeod and Bill McLaren were out having a meal together and bumped into ten Bos near a cafe. Hugh McLeod took Ten Bos aside, and told him bluntly:

"Frans, ye think ye're a guid forrit [forward] but really ye're jist a big lump o' potted meat. If ah was half yer size I'd pick up the first two Frenchman that looked at me the morn [tomorrow] and ah'd chuck them right ower the bloody stand."

Ten Bos tapped McLaren on the shoulder as they left the cafe, and said, "You know, I'd follow him anywhere." Scotland later won the game 11–6, rare for an away game.

McLeod retired after 40 caps, "because 40 is a nice round figure." McLeod's hobby in later life has been dog shows mainly using his bulldog Spike. He died at the age of 81 on 12 May 2014.
