= Alex Hastie =

Scotland international rugby union player

- Born: Alexander James Hastie; 29 July 1935 Hawick, Scotland
- Died: 7 June 2010 (aged 74) Melrose, Scotland

Rugby union career
- Position: Scrum half
Amateur team(s)
Years	Team	Apps	(Points)
1954-	Melrose		
Provincial / State sides
Years	Team	Apps	(Points)
1962	South of Scotland District		
1962	Provinces District		
1962-63	Whites Trial		
International career
Years	Team	Apps	(Points)
1961-68	Scotland	18	(0)
Coaching career
- Years: Team
- Melrose Colts

Alexander James Hastie (29 July 1935 – 7 June 2010), also known as Alex Hastie or Eck Hastie was a Scotland international rugby union player. He played at Scrum-half; and was commonly linked with David Chisholm, his pairing at Fly-half for club and country.

== Rugby Union career ==
=== Amateur career ===
Hastie played for Melrose. He first played for the side in 1954 when 17 years old.

He was club captain when Melrose won the Scottish Unofficial Championship in 1962-63 season; and the Border League in that same year.

Of his pairing with David Chisholm, Allan Massie said:

"They played together for Melrose for eleven seasons, in the course of which Chisholm scored more than a thousand points for the club... As a pair their understanding made them more than the sum of two individuals. Did Hastie ever lose Chisholm in any of the thirteen internationals they played together? It was their joint ability to tidy up bad ball and even turn it to advantage that made them the most secure of partnerships. Both tackled better than many wing forwards, and they would have revelled in the modern game... Their record of going ten internationals without defeat is unparalleled."

Neither of them made it onto the British and Irish Lions tour to New Zealand. Hastie was said to have a particularly "effective hand-off".

Bill McLaren thought that:

"Hastie was one of that Border breed of durable scrum-halves, all 'shilpit' little chaps, seemingly in need of a good meal and all of whom, through operating behind lightweight packs always struggling for ball, had to live on their wits and raw courage."

=== Provincial career ===
He played for South of Scotland District.

He was part of the North-South Provinces District side that beat Canada in 1962.

He played for the Whites Trial side in their matches against the Blues Trial to determine international selection. He turned out for Whites in their 2nd trial match in 1962-63 season.

=== International career ===
He played for Scotland from 1961 to 1968.

=== Coaching career ===
He coached the Melrose Colts, the youth team of Melrose.
