= Bill Hunter (catcher) =

American baseball player (1855–1918)

- Catcher
- Born: 1855; St. Thomas, Canada West
- Died: April 12, 1918 (aged 62–63); Chicago, Illinois
- Batted: Right Threw: Unknown

MLB debut
- May 2, 1884, for the Louisville Eclipse

Last MLB appearance
- May 9, 1884, for the Louisville Eclipse

MLB statistics
- Batting average: .143
- Home runs: 0
- Runs batted in: 0
- Stats at Baseball Reference

Teams
- Louisville Eclipse (1884)

William F. Hunter (1855 – April 12, 1918) was a professional baseball player who briefly played as a catcher in the Major Leagues for the 1884 Louisville Eclipse. He played in the minor leagues from 1883 to 1887.
