= David Chisholm =

Scottish rugby union player

- Born: David Chisholm; 23 January 1937 St. Boswells, Scottish Borders, Scotland
- Died: 27 July 1998 (aged 61) Scottish Borders, Scotland
- Notable relative: Robin Chisholm (brother)

Rugby union career
- Position: Fly-half
Amateur team(s)
Years	Team	Apps	(Points)
- Melrose RFC
International career
Years	Team	Apps	(Points)
1964–1968	Scotland	14	(15)

David Chisholm (St. Boswells, 23 January 1937 – Borders, 27 July 1998) was a Scottish rugby union player. He played as a fly-half.

He had 14 caps for Scotland, from 1964 to 1968, scoring 1 try and 4 drop goals, 15 points on aggregate. He played in the Five Nations Championship, in 1964, 1965, 1966, 1967 and 1968, playing in 11 games and scoring 2 drop goals, 6 points on aggregate. He also played for Melrose RFC.

He was commonly linked with Alex Hastie, according to Allan Massie:

"They played together for Melrose for eleven seasons, in the course of which Chisholm scored more than a thousand points for the club... As a pair their understanding made them more than the sum of two individuals. Did Hastie ever lose Chisholm in any of the thirteen internationals they played together? It was their joint ability to tidy up bad ball and even turn it to advantage that made them the most secure of partnerships. Both tackled better than many wing forwards, and they would have revelled in the modern game... Their record of going ten internationals without defeat is unparalleled."

His brother Robin Chisholm was also capped for Scotland. He was a father of two and a grandfather of four.
