= Bill Hunter (New Zealand footballer) =

New Zealand footballer

Personal information
- Full name: William Hunter
- Place of birth: New Zealand

Senior career*
Years	Team	Apps	(Gls)
- Eden

International career
1968–1969	New Zealand	6	(0)
- * Club domestic league appearances and goals

William Hunter is an association football player who represented New Zealand at international level.

Hunter made his full All Whites debut in a 5–0 win over Fiji on 17 September 1968 and ended his international playing career with six A-international caps to his credit, his final cap an appearance in a 0–2 loss to Israel on 1 October 1969.

Hunter played two games (one for Auckland and one for New Zealand) in 1967 against the Manchester United team that toured New Zealand that year. The Manchester United team included the “holy trinity” of players - George Best, Bobby Charlton, and Denis Law.

Hunter has three sons, Todd, Matthew, and Daniel. Matthew and Daniel also represented New Zealand, playing soccer for the NZ Combined Services and the NZ Universities teams respectively.
