= New Anniesland =

Sports venue in Glasgow, Scotland

Coordinates: 55°53′20″N 4°19′52″W

New Anniesland is a sports ground in the Anniesland area of Glasgow, Scotland, used for rugby union and cricket. Owned by The Glasgow Academical Club, a sports and social club for alumni of The Glasgow Academy, it is the home ground of Glasgow Academicals RFC and Glasgow Academical Cricket Club.

== History ==
New Anniesland was opened in 1902, following The Glasgow Academy's purchase of farmland adjacent to their existing sports ground, which they had occupied since 1883. The original ground, subsequently called Old Anniesland, was then taken over by the University of Glasgow. A cricket pavilion, groundsman's house and small grandstand, designed by the Laird brothers, were built in 1908. The ground also included curling rinks at this time. The original pavilion is still in use by the Glasgow Academical Cricket Club in the 21st century, albeit with later extensions, and is thought to be the oldest cricket pavilion in Glasgow.

Wooden terraces and stands were constructed for rugby matches, and a crowd of 10,000 — then a record for Scottish club rugby — watched Glasgow Accies play Heriot's FP in 1922. Although these structures no longer exist, the ground still features a small timber grandstand, backing onto Helensburgh Drive, which dates to 1958.

The ground hosted fixtures during the 2004 IRB Under 21 Rugby World Cup, and was used as a training ground for international teams preparing for the Rugby Sevens at Ibrox during the 2014 Glasgow Commonwealth Games.

== International cricket ==
New Anniesland was one of the venues when Scotland hosted the European Cricket Championship in 2000 and 2006. In 2000, it staged Israel's matches against Portugal and Greece. The 2006 fixtures featured Israel three times, against Jersey, Norway and France, as well Scotland against Denmark and the Division Two final between Jersey and Norway.
