= 1911–12 Scottish Districts season =

Rugby union competition

- Countries: Scotland
- Date: 1911–12
- Matches played: 1

The 1911–12 Scottish Districts season is a record of all the rugby union matches for Scotland's district teams.

== History ==
Edinburgh District beat Glasgow District in the Inter-City match

Blues beat Whites in a trial match.

North District played Midlands District on 4 November 1911.

== Results ==
| Date | Try | Conversion | Penalty | Dropped goal | Goal from mark | Notes |
|---|---|---|---|---|---|---|
| 1905–1947 | 3 points | 2 points | 3 points | 4 points | 3 points | |

=== Inter-City ===
2 December 1911

| Glasgow District | 6 - 21 | Edinburgh District |
| | Report |

Hamilton Crescent, Glasgow

Glasgow District:
Edinburgh District:

=== Other Scottish matches ===
28 October 1911
3pm

| North of Scotland Reds | v | North of Scotland Colours |
| | Preview |

Mannofield, Aberdeen

North Reds: Cheyne (Aberdeen University), McAndrew (Gordonians), Saunders (Aberdeen University), Hay (Aberdeen University), R. Ledingham (Aberdeen GSFP), A. Ledingham (Queen's Cross), A. M. Johnston (Aberdeen GSFP), Mulligan (Aberdeen University), Hogg (Aberdeen University), Cameron (Aberdeen University), Simpson (Aberdeen GSFP), G. Ledingham (Aberdeen GSFP), Snowie (Queen's Cross), R. Johnston (Queen's Cross), Macintosh (Queen's Cross)
North Colours: Stronach (Aberdeen University), Wilkinson (Queen's Cross), D. Leith (Aberdeen GSFP), Duffus (Aberdeen GSFP), Gillespie (Aberdeenshire), Macintosh (Queen's Cross), Whamond (Aberdeen University), Hodson (Aberdeenshire), Gilbert (Aberdeenshire), Nichol (Queen's Cross), Morgan (Queen's Cross), Grant (Gordonians), Ross (Aberdeen GSFP), G. Leith (Aberdeen GSFP), Clark (Aberdeen University)

9 December 1911

| South of Scotland District | v | North of Scotland District |
| | Preview; Report |

Galashiels

South of Scotland District:
North of Scotland District:

23 December 1911

| Combined Scottish Districts | 13 - 21 | Anglo-Scots |
| | Report |

Union field, Inverleith

Combined Scottish Districts:
Anglo-Scots:

=== Trial matches ===
6 January 1912

| Blues Trial | v | Whites Trial |
| | Report; Report |

Blues Trial:
Whites Trial:

=== English matches ===
No other District matches played.

=== International matches ===
No touring matches this season.
