= 2019–20 Super 6 =

Rugby union Super 6 season

- Countries: Scotland
- Date: 8 November 2019 – 29 March 2020
- Champions: Watsonians (1st title)
- Runners-up: Heriot's Rugby
- Matches played: 30 [*Season incomplete]
- Top point scorer: Lee Millar (84) Watsonians
- Top try scorer: Sam Kitchen (8) Ayrshire Bulls

The 2019–20 Super 6 (also known as the Fosroc Super 6 for sponsorship reasons) is the inaugural season of a semi-professional rugby union competition for Scotland's club sides.

The six teams are competing in the Super 6 this season are Ayrshire Bulls, Boroughmuir Bears, Heriot's Rugby, Stirling County, Watsonians and Southern Knights.

== Competition format ==
League Stage

All sides will play each other home and away.

League Play-Offs

The 1st placed team in the league stage then plays the 4th best team in that stage.

The 2nd placed team in the league stage plays the 3rd best team in that stage.

The 5th placed team in the league plays the 6th best team in that stage at home.

Final

The winners of the 1st-4th match will play the winners of the 2nd-3rd match to determine the winners of the Super 6 tournament and the runners-up.

The losers of the 1st-4th match will play the losers of the 2nd-3rd match to determine the 3rd & 4th place slots.

The 6th best team in the league plays the 5th best team in that stage at home. The home and away format will determine 5th and 6th place.

The final was due to take place at Scotstoun Stadium, the home of Glasgow Warriors.

== Coronavirus pandemic ==
Due to the coronavirus pandemic the Scottish Rugby Union made season 2019-20 null and void. This meant that the Super 6 fixtures ended after the 10 rounds of the League Stage and did not continue into the Super 6 play-offs.

The cross-border competition that was scheduled between Super 6 clubs and Welsh clubs was also cancelled due to the coronavirus pandemic.

== Table ==
2019–20 Super 6 Table
	Team	P	W	D	L	PF	PA	PD	TBP	LBP	PTS
1	Watsonians	10	8	0	2	253	185	+68	3	2	37
2	Heriot's Rugby	10	7	0	3	259	190	+69	4	2	34
3	Ayrshire Bulls	10	6	0	4	216	182	+34	4	0	28
4	Southern Knights	10	4	1	5	238	204	+34	5	4	27
5	Stirling County	10	3	1	6	188	254	-66	3	1	18
6	Boroughmuir Bears	10	1	0	9	215	354	-139	4	3	11
Yellow background indicates the play-off places for the semi-final match. Green background indicates the play-off places for the semi-final match. Plain background indicates teams that will play-off home and away for 5th and 6th position. (CH) Champions. (RU) Runners-up. (3rd) Won 3rd place play-off (4th) Lost 3rd place play-off (5th) Won 5th place play-off (6th) Lost 5th place play-off.

== League stage rounds ==
All times are local.

=== Round 1 ===
8 November 2019
7.30pm

(1BP) Boroughmuir Bears (Scotland)	24 - 27	(Scotland) Stirling County
Try: George Shannon; Jordan Edmunds; Glen Faulds; Con: Kyle McGhie x 3 Pen: Glen Faulds	Preview; Report	Try: Reyner Kennedy; Caleb Korteweg; Ollie Bartlett; Con: Josh Henderson x 2 Pen: Josh Henderson x 2

Meggetland Sports Complex
Attendance: 1,521
Referee: David Sutherland

9 November 2019
3pm

(1BP) Southern Knights (Scotland)	13 - 14	(Scotland) Watsonians
Try: Michael Mvelase-Julyan; Con: Struan Hutchison; Pen: Struan Hutchison x 2	Preview; Report	Try: Joe Reynolds; Lewis Berg; Con: Lee Millar x 2

The Greenyards
Attendance: 1,076
Referee: Ian Kenny

10 November 2019
2pm

Ayrshire Bulls (Scotland)	13 - 25	(Scotland) Heriot's Rugby
Try: Tyler Beary; Con: Frazier Climo; Pen: Frazier Climo x 2	Preview; Report	Try: Iain Wilson; Ronan Seydak; Penalty try Con: Ross Jones; Pen: Ross Jones x 2

Millbrae
Attendance: 1,341
Referee: Keith Allen

=== Round 2 ===
16 November 2019
3pm

(1BP) Ayrshire Bulls (Scotland)	32 - 27	(Scotland) Boroughmuir Bears (1BP)
Try: Rory Hughes x 2 Sam Kitchen; Tom Lewis; Graham Geldenhuys; Con: Frazier Climo x 2 Pen: Frazier Climo	Preview; Report	Try: Thomas Wilson; George Thornton; Kyle McGhie; Con: Gavin Parker; Kyle McGhie x 2 Pen: Gavin Parker x 2

Millbrae
Referee: Finlay Brown

16 November 2019
4pm

(1 BP) Stirling County (Scotland)	24 - 24	(Scotland) Southern Knights
Try: Dean Taylor-Menzies; Reyner Kennedy; Andrew Davidson; Caleb Korteweg; Con: Josh Henderson x 2	Preview; Report	Try: Ruaridh Knott; Michael Mvelase-Julya; Patrick Anderson; Con: Ciaran Whyte x 3 Pen: Ciaran Whyte

Bridgehaugh Park
Attendance: 1,300
Referee: Hollie Davidson

17 November 2019
2pm

Heriot's Rugby (Scotland)	17 - 32	(Scotland) Watsonians (1BP)
Try: Rory McMichael; Scott Riddell; Con: Alex Ball x 2 Pen: Alex Ball	Preview; Report	Try: Lomond MacPherson x 2 Joe Reynolds; Angus Guthrie; Cal Davis; Con: Lee Millar x 2 Pen: Lee Millar

Goldenacre Sports Ground
Attendance: 1,235
Referee: Keith Allen

=== Round 3 ===
22 November 2019
7.30pm

(1BP) Boroughmuir Bears (Scotland)	34 - 31	(Scotland) Heriot's Rugby (2BP)
Try: Cammy Gray; Johnny Matthews; Ewan Stewart; Jack Steele; Con: Kyle McGhie x 4 Pen: Kyle McGhie x 2	Preview; Report	Try: Jason Hill; Michael Liness; Dan Nutton; Andrew Simmers; Con: Ross Jones x 4 Pen: Ross Jones

Meggetland Sports Complex
Attendance: 1,041
Referee: Michael Todd

23 November 2019
5.30pm

Southern Knights (Scotland)	10 - 29	(Scotland) Ayrshire Bulls (1BP)
Try: Russell Anderson; Pen: Jason Baggott x 2	Preview; Report	Try: Sam Kitchen x 2 Ross Thompson; Stafford McDowall; Con: Ross Thompson x 3 Pen: Ross Thompson

The Greenyards
Attendance: c.500
Referee: Ross Mabon

24 November 2019
3pm

(1BP) Watsonians (Scotland)	34 - 22	(Scotland) Stirling County
Try: Cal Davies x 3 Angus Guthrie; Kody McGovern; Con: Lee Millar x 3 Pen: Lee Millar	Preview; Report	Try: Adam Ashe x 2 Robbie Kent; Con: Brandon Thomson x 2 Pen: Brandon Thomson

Myreside Stadium
Referee: Ruairidh Campbell

=== Round 4 ===
30 November 2019
2pm

Heriot's Rugby (Scotland)	cancelled	(Scotland) Stirling County
	Preview

Goldenacre Sports Ground
Referee: Finlay Brown

The Heriot's Rugby v Stirling County match was cancelled on the morning of the 30 November 2019 due to overnight frost.

30 November 2019
3pm

Ayrshire Bulls (Scotland)	cancelled	(Scotland) Watsonians
	Preview

Millbrae
Referee: David Sutherland

The Ayrshire Bulls v Watsonians pitch was deemed unplayable and the match was cancelled shortly before kick off.

1 December 2019
2pm

Boroughmuir Bears (Scotland)	cancelled	(Scotland) Southern Knights
	Preview

Meggetland Sports Complex
Referee: Graeme Ormiston

The Boroughmuir Bears v Southern Knights match was called off at a pitch inspection at 10.30am on the morning of the match. The postponement due to a frozen pitch.

=== Round 5 ===
7 December 2019
4.30pm

(1BP) Southern Knights (Scotland)	12 - 19	(Scotland) Heriot's Rugby
Try: Joe Jenkins; Jason Baggott; Con: Jason Baggott	Preview; Report	Try: Penalty try Jack Blain; Michael Liness; Con: Ross Jones

The Greenyards
Referee: Ian Kenny

8 December 2019
2pm

Watsonians (Scotland)	28 - 10	(Scotland) Boroughmuir Bears
Try: Morgan Inness; Harrison Courtney; Campbell Wilson; Con: Lee Millar x 2 Pen: Lee Millar x 3	Preview; Report	Try: Glen Faulds; Con: Kyle McGhie; Pen: Kyle McGhie

Myreside Stadium
Referee: David Sutherland

8 December 2019
2pm

Stirling County (Scotland)	0 - 8	(Scotland) Ayrshire Bulls
	Preview; Report	Try: Nico Griffiths; Pen: Ross Thompson

Bridgehaugh Park
Referee: Sam Grove-White

=== Round 6 ===
14 December 2019
2pm

Heriot's Rugby (Scotland)	22 - 16	(Scotland) Southern Knights (1BP)
Try: Michael Liness; Cameron Hutchison; James Couper; Con: Ross Jones x 2 Pen: Ross Jones	Preview; Report	Try: Fraser Renwick; Ruaridh Knott; Pen: Jason Baggott x 2

Goldenacre Sports Ground
Referee: Graeme Ormiston

14 December 2019
2pm

(1BP) Ayrshire Bulls (Scotland)	30 - 8	(Scotland) Stirling County
Try: Sam Kitchen x 2 Blair Macpherson; Ollie Smith; Con: Ross Thompson x 2 Pen: Ross Thompson x 2	Preview; Report	Try: Andrew Goudie; Pen: Andrew Goudie

Millbrae
Referee: Ben Blain

15 December 2019
2pm

(1BP) Boroughmuir Bears (Scotland)	20 - 30	(Scotland) Watsonians
Try: Johnny Matthews x 2 Callum Atkinson; Cammy Gray	Preview; Report	Try: Mesulame Kunavula; Harrison Courtney; Ruaridh Smith; Con: Lee Millar x 3 Pen: Lee Millar x 3

Meggetland Sports Complex
Referee: David Sutherland

=== Round 4 rescheduled ===
21 December 2019
2pm

(1BP) Heriot's Rugby (Scotland)	29 - 19	(Scotland) Stirling County
Try: James Spencer x 2 Chris Keen; Jack Blain; Con: Ross Jones x 3 Pen: Ross Jones	Preview; Report	Try: Penalty try Reyner Kennedy; Bruce Sorbie; Con: Andrew Goudie

Goldenacre Sports Ground
Referee: Finlay Brown

21 December 2019
3pm

Ayrshire Bulls (Scotland)	19 - 13	(Scotland) Watsonians (1BP)
Try: Ollie Smith; Penalty try Blair MacPherson; Con: Ross Thompson	Preview; Report	Try: Mesulame Kunavula; Con: Lee Millar; Pen: Lee Millar x 2

Millbrae
Referee: Mike Adamson

10 January 2020
7.30pm

Boroughmuir Bears (Scotland)	12 - 31	(Scotland) Southern Knights (1BP)
Try: Jordan Edmunds; Ewan Stewart; Con: Chris Laidlaw	Preview; Report	Try: Gavin Wood; Ewan Mcquillian x 2 Russell Anderson; Joe Jenkins; Con: Jason Baggott x 2 Gavin Wood

Meggetland Sports Complex
Referee: David Sutherland

=== Round 7 ===
18 January 2020
3pm

Watsonians (Scotland)	27-10	(Scotland) Ayrshire Bulls
Try: Lomond Macpherson; Connor Boyle; Lewis Berg; Con: Lee Millar x 3 Pen: Lee Millar x 2	Preview; Report	Try: Tom Lewis; Con: Ross Thompson; Pen: Ross Thompson

Myreside Stadium
Referee: Graeme Ormiston

18 January 2020
4pm

(1BP) Stirling County (Scotland)	15-16	(Scotland) Heriot's Rugby
Try: Ewan MacGarvie; Ollie Bartlett; Con: Josh Henderson; Pen: Josh Henderson	Preview; Report	Try: Cameron Hutchinson; Con: Ross Jones; Pen: Ross Jones x 3

Bridgehaugh Park
Referee: Ian Kenny

19 January 2020
2pm

(1BP) Southern Knights (Scotland)	46-27	(Scotland) Boroughmuir Bears (1BP)
Try: Ciaran Whyte x 2 Kyle McGhie; Fraser Renwick x 2 Tom Galbraith; Con: Jason Baggott x 5 Pen: Jason Baggott x 2	Preview; Report	Try: Jordan Edmunds; Greg Cannie; Mesu Dolokoto; Cammy Gray; Con: Kyle McGhie x 2 Pen: Kyle McGhie

The Greenyards
Referee: Finlay Brown

=== Round 8 ===
25 January 2020
2pm

(1BP) Heriot's Rugby (Scotland)	53-10	(Scotland) Boroughmuir Bears
Try: Cameron Hutchison x 2 James Couper; Iain Wilson; Penalty try Andrew Simmers; Charlie Jupp; James Spencer; Alex Ball; Con: Ross Jones x 3	Preview; Report	Try: Jordan Edmunds; Con: Jack Steele; Pen: Martin Cimprich

Goldenacre Sports Ground
Referee: Keith Allen

25 January 2020
3pm

(1BP) Stirling County (Scotland)	27-24	(Scotland) Watsonians (1BP)
Try: Ali Mackie x 3 Landon Hayes; Con: Josh Henderson x 2 Pen: Josh Henderson	Preview; Report	Try: Andrew Chalmers; Brian Leitch; Lewis Berg; Con: Lee Millar x 3 Pen: Lee Millar

Bridgehaugh Park
Referee: David Sutherland

26 January 2020
2pm

Ayrshire Bulls (Scotland)	20-29	(Scotland) Southern Knights (1BP)
Try: Sam Kitchen x 2 Con: Ross Thompson x 2 Pen: Ross Thompson x 2	Preview; Report	Try: Penalty try Neil Irvine-Hess; Conor Young; Ciaran Whyte; Con: Struan Hutchinson x 2 Pen: Struan Hutchinson

Millbrae
Referee: Sam Grove-White

=== Round 9 ===
14 February 2020
7.30pm

Watsonians (Scotland)	24 - 21	(Scotland) Heriot's Rugby (1BP)
Try: Lewis Berg penalty try Jamie Forbes; Con: Lee Millar x 2 Pen: Lee Millar	Preview; Report	Try: Chris Dean; James Couper penalty try Con: Ross Jones x 2

Myreside Stadium
Referee: Mike Adamson

15 February 2020
4pm

Boroughmuir Bears (Scotland)	cancelled	(Scotland) Ayrshire Bulls

Meggetland Sports Complex

16 February 2020
2pm

(1BP) Southern Knights (Scotland)	31 - 10	(Scotland) Stirling County
Try: Fraser Renwick; Jason Baggott; Ruaridh Knott; Russell Anderson; Neil Irvine-Hess; Con: Jason Baggott x 3	Preview; Report	Try: Landon Hayes; Caleb Korteweg

The Greenyards
Referee: Finlay Brown

23 February 2020
3.45pm

Boroughmuir Bears (Scotland)	17 - 40	(Scotland) Ayrshire Bulls (1BP)
Try: Archie Russell; Glen Faulds; Con: Chris Laidlaw x 2 Pen: Chris Laidlaw	Preview; Report	Try: Peter McCallum; Sam Kitchen; George Bordill; Nico Griffiths; Tyler Beaty; Craig Gossman; Con: Ross Thompson x 5

Dundas Avenue, Queensferry Sports and Community Hub, Queensferry RFC
Referee: Sam Grove-White

=== Round 10 ===
29 February 2020
2.30pm

(1BP) Stirling County (Scotland)	36 - 34	(Scotland) Boroughmuir Bears (2BP)
Try: Reynor Kennedy; George Arnott x 2 Connor Gordon x 2 Con: Brandon Thomson x 4 Pen: Brandon Thomson	Preview; Report	Try: Scott McGinley; Archie Russell; Jordan Edmunds; Murray Johnston; Con: Chris Laidlaw x 4 Pen: Chris Laidlaw x 2

Oriam
Referee: Ross Mabon

1 March 2020
2pm

(1BP) Heriot's Rugby (Scotland)	26 - 15	(Scotland) Ayrshire Bulls
Try: Jason Hill; Callum Marshall; Dan Nutton; Harry Patterson; Con: Ross Jones x 3	Preview; Report	Try: Blair MacPherson; Alex McGuire; Con: Ross Thompson; Pen: Ross Thompson

Goldenacre Sports Ground
Referee: Ian Kenny

6 March 2020
7.30pm

(1BP) Watsonians (Scotland)	28 - 26	(Scotland) Southern Knights (2BP)
Try: Mesulame Kunavula; Cal Davies penalty try Ewan Fox; Con: Lee Millar x 3	Preview; Report	Try: Iain Moody; Ruaridh Knott; Ciaran Whyte; Fraser Renwick; Con: Jason Baggott x 3

Myreside Stadium
Referee: Hollie Davidson

== Team of the Tournament ==
The 2019–20 Super 6 team of the tournament was named as follows:-

Pos		Player	Team
FB	15	(Scotland) Ollie Smith	Ayrshire Bulls
RW	14	(Scotland) Rory McMichael	Heriot's Rugby
OC	13	(New Zealand) Joe Reynolds	Watsonians
IC	12	(Scotland) Cameron Hutchinson	Heriot's Rugby
LW	11	(Scotland) Jordan Edmunds	Boroughmuir Bears
FH	10	(Scotland) Lee Millar	Watsonians
SH	9	(Scotland) Andrew Simmers	Heriot's Rugby
N8	8	(Scotland) Morgan Innes	Watsonians
OF	7	(Scotland) Conor Boyle	Watsonians
BF	6	(Scotland) Iain Wilson	Heriot's Rugby
RL	5	(Scotland) Jamie Hodgson	Watsonians
LL	4	(Scotland) Marshall Sykes	Ayrshire Bulls
TP	3	(Scotland) Murphy Walker	Stirling County
HK	2	(Scotland) Reynor Kennedy	Stirling County
LP	1	(Scotland) Grant Shiells	Southern Knights
Substitutes
HK	16	(Australia) Sam Kitchen	Ayrshire Bulls
LP	17	(Scotland) Gordon Reid	Ayrshire Bulls
TP	18	(Scotland) Dan Gamble	Heriot's Rugby
LK	19	(Scotland) Cameron Henderson	Stirling County
FL	20	(Scotland) Jack MacLean	Heriot's Rugby
FH	21	(Scotland) Struan Hutchinson	Southern Knights
FH	22	(Scotland) Ross Thompson	Ayrshire Bulls
CE	23	(Scotland) Ciaran Whyte	Southern Knights

== Leading Points scorers ==
The leading points scorers from the League Stage rounds of the competition.

Player	Points	Team
(Scotland) Lee Millar	84	Watsonians
(Scotland) Ross Jones	62	Heriot's Rugby
(Scotland) Ross Thompson	61	Ayrshire Bulls

== Leading Try scorers ==
The leading try scorers from the League Stage rounds of the competition.

Player	No. of Tries	Team
(Australia) Sam Kitchen	8	Ayrshire Bulls
(Scotland) Cal Davies	5	Watsonians
(Scotland) Jordan Edmunds	5	Boroughmuir Bears
(Scotland) Reynor Kennedy	5	Stirling County
(Scotland) Fraser Renwick	5	Southern Knights
