= 2021–22 Super 6 =

Rugby union Super 6 season

- Countries: Scotland
- Champions: Ayrshire Bulls (1st title)
- Runners-up: Southern Knights

The 2021–22 Super 6 (also known as the Fosroc Super 6 for sponsorship reasons) is the second season of a semi-professional rugby union competition for Scotland's club sides. The season tournament for 2020–21 did not take place due to the COVID-19 pandemic.

The six teams competing in this season's Super 6 are Ayrshire Bulls, Boroughmuir Bears, Heriot's Rugby, Stirling County, Watsonians and Southern Knights.

== Competition format ==
League Stage : Weeks One to Ten

All sides will play each other home and away in a double round robin, using the rugby points system.

League play-offs

Final : The first and second place teams play to determine the winners and the runners-up of the Super 6 tournament .

3rd/4th play-off : The third and fourth placed teams play to determine the 3rd & 4th place slots.

5th/6th play-off : The fifth and sixth placed teams play to determine the 5rd & 6th place slots.

== Coronavirus pandemic ==
The fixtures announced are subject to Scottish Government regulations regarding the COVID-19 pandemic.

== Table ==
2021–22 Super 6 Table
	Team	P	W	D	L	PF	PA	PD	TBP	LBP	PTS
1	Southern Knights (RU)	10	7	1	2	268	173	+95	6	0	36
2	Ayrshire Bulls (CH)	10	6	0	4	268	183	+85	6	1	31
3	Watsonians (3rd)	10	5	0	5	251	224	+27	5	3	28
4	Stirling County (4th)	10	4	1	5	205	266	-51	3	3	24
5	Heriot's Rugby (6th)	10	4	0	7	177	246	-69	2	2	20
6	Boroughmuir Bears (5th)	10	3	0	7	178	255	-77	0	2	14
Yellow background indicates qualification for the final. Green background indicates teams that will play-off home and away for 3th and 4th position. Plain background indicates teams that will play-off home and away for 5th and 6th position. (CH) Champions. (RU) Runners-up. (3rd) Won 3rd place play-off (4th) Lost 3rd place play-off (5th) Won 5th place play-off (6th) Lost 5th place play-off.

== League stage rounds ==
All times are local.

Attendances limited due to the COVID-19 pandemic.

=== Round 1 ===
30 July 2021
7.30pm

Boroughmuir Bears (Scotland)	15 - 13	(Scotland) Heriot's Rugby (1BP)
Pen: Tom Pittman x 5	Preview; Report	Try: Lloyd Wheeldon; Iain Wilson; Pen: Bruce Houston

Meggetland Sports Complex
Attendance: 400
Referee: Keith Allen

31 July 2021
3pm

Stirling County (Scotland)	24 - 24	(Scotland) Southern Knights (1BP)
Try: Logan Trotter; Reyner Kennedy; Grant Hughes; Con: Marcus Holden x 3 Pen: Marcus Holden	Preview; Report	Try: Paddy Anderson; Penalty Try; Fraser Renwick; Russell Anderson; Con: Jason Baggott

Bridgehaugh Park
Referee: Ian Kenny

1 August 2021
1.30pm

(1BP) Ayrshire Bulls (Scotland)	21 - 26	(Scotland) Watsonians
Try: Matt Minogue; George Thornton; Robbie Nairn; Con: Matt Minogue x 3	Preview; Report	Try: Harvey Elms; Jamie Forbes; Con: Lee Millar x 2 Pen: Lee Millar x 4

Millbrae
Referee: Finlay Brown

=== Round 2 ===
6 August 2021

Watsonians (Scotland)	10 - 7	(Scotland) Stirling County (1BP)
Try: Sam Daly; Con: Marc Morrison; Pen: Marc Morrison	Preview; Report	Try: Reyner Kennedy; Con: Andrew Goudie

Myreside Stadium
Referee: Keith Allen

7 August 2021

Ayrshire Bulls (Scotland)	24 - 10	(Scotland) Boroughmuir Bears
Try: Tom Jordan; Michael Scott; Con: Christian Townsend; Pen: Christian Townsend x 4	Preview; Report	Try: Trystan Andrews; Con: Tom Pittman; Pen: Tom Pittman

Millbrae
Referee: Graeme Ormiston

8 August 2021

Heriot's Rugby (Scotland)	15 - 36	(Scotland) Southern Knights (1BP)
Try: Callum Young; Stuart Edwards; Con: Bruce Houston; Pen: Bruce Houston	Preview; Report	Try: Penalty Try; Jacob Henry; Russell Anderson; Patrick Anderson; Con: Jason Baggott; Pen: Jason Baggott x 4

Goldenacre Sports Ground
Referee: David Sutherland

=== Round 3 ===
13 August 2021
7.30pm

Boroughmuir Bears (Scotland)	13 - 36	(Scotland) Watsonians (1BP)
Try: Tom Brown; Con: Tom Pittman; Pen: Tom Pittman x 2	Preview; Report	Try: Luis Ball x 2 Sam Daly; Stevie Longwell; Ross Graham; Con: Marc Morrison x 4 Pen: Marc Morrison

Meggetland Sports Complex
Referee: Ian Kenny

14 August 2021
3pm

Southern Knights (Scotland)	22 - 20	(Scotland) Ayrshire Bulls (1BP)
Try: Penalty try Nyle Godsmark; Jacob Henry; Con: Jason Baggott; Pen: Jason Baggott	Preview; Report	Try: Ruaridh Sayce; Tom Jordan; Thomas Williams; Con: Matt Minogue; Pen: Christian Townsend

The Greenyards
Referee: Keith Allen

15 August 2021
1.30pm

Stirling County (Scotland) (1BP)	18 - 19	(Scotland) Heriot's Rugby
Try: Kristian Kay; Archie Russell; Con: Andrew Goudie; Pen: Andrew Goudie x 2	Preview; Report	Try: Ruaridh Leishman; Penalty try Alex Ball; Con: Bruce Houston

Bridgehaugh Park
Referee: Finlay Brown

=== Round 4 ===
21 August 2021
3pm

Heriot's Rugby (Scotland)	26 - 8	(Scotland) Watsonians
Try: Ross Jones; Robert Kay; Con: Bruce Houston x 2 Pen: Bruce Houston x 3 Drop: Bruce Houston	Preview; Report	Try: Steven Longwell; Pen: Marc Morrison

Goldenacre Sports Ground
Referee: Graeme Ormiston

21 August 2021
7.30pm

(1BP) Stirling County (Scotland)	30 - 28	(Scotland) Ayrshire Bulls (1BP)
Try: Steven Hamilton; Dean Taylor-Menzies; Angus Fraser; Tom Roche; Reyner Kennedy; Con: Andrew Goudie; Pen: Craig Robertson	Preview; Report	Try: Tom Jordan; Blair MacPherson; Matt Davidson; Con: Matt Minogue; Tom Jordan; Pen: Matt Minogue x 3

Bridgehaugh Park
Referee: Ian Kenny

22 August 2021
1.30pm

Southern Knights (Scotland)	22 - 13	(Scotland) Boroughmuir Bears
Try: Craig Jackson; Jason Baggott; Euan McLaren; Con: Jason Baggott x 2 Pen: Jason Baggott	Preview; Report	Try: Tom Brown; Jordan Edmunds; Pen: Tom Pittman

The Greenyards
Referee: David Sutherland

=== Round 5 ===
27 August 2021
7.30pm

(1BP) Watsonians (Scotland)	32 - 21	(Scotland) Southern Knights
Try: Karl Main; Cal Davies; Steven Longwell; Sam Daly; Con: Marc Morrison x 3 Pen: Marc Morrison x 2	Preview; Report	Try: Patrick Anderson; Joe Jenkins; Con: Jason Baggott; Pen: Jason Baggott x 2 Drop: Jason Baggott

Myreside Stadium
Referee: David Sutherland

28 August 2021
3pm

(1BP) Ayrshire Bulls (Scotland)	41 - 7	(Scotland) Heriot's Rugby
Try: Blair MacPherson x 3 Elias Cavan; Robbie Nairn; Jordan Lenac; Con: Tom Jordan x 2 Matt Minogue x 2 Pen: Tom Jordan	Preview; Report	Try: James Couper; Con: Bruce Houston

Millbrae
Referee: Mike Adamson

29 August 2021
1.30pm

Boroughmuir Bears (Scotland)	23 - 17	(Scotland) Stirling County
Try: Euan Ferrie; Tom Brown; Con: Tom Pittman x 2 Pen: Tom Pittman x 2 Drop: Tom Pittman	Preview; Report	Try: Dean Taylor-Menzies; Archie Russell; Tom Roche; Con: Craig Robertson

Meggetland Sports Complex
Referee: Graeme Ormiston

=== Round 6 ===
10 September 2021
7.30pm

Watsonians (Scotland)	20 - 21	(Scotland) Heriot's Rugby
	Preview; Report

Myreside Stadium
Referee: Finlay Brown

11 September 2021
3.30pm

Ayrshire Bulls (Scotland)	48 - 17	(Scotland) Stirling County
	Preview; Report

Millbrae
Referee: David Sutherland

12 September 2021
1.30pm

Boroughmuir Bears (Scotland)	8 - 29	(Scotland) Southern Knights
	Preview; Report

Meggetland Sports Complex
Referee: Sam Grove-White

=== Round 7 ===
17 September 2021
7.30pm

Southern Knights (Scotland)	25 - 8	(Scotland) Watsonians
	Preview; Report

The Greenyards
Referee: Ben Blain

18 September 2021
3pm

Stirling County (Scotland)	27 - 23	(Scotland) Boroughmuir Bears
	Preview; Report

Bridgehaugh
Referee: Ian Kenny

19 September 2021
1.30pm

Heriot's Rugby (Scotland)	0 - 28	(Scotland) Ayrshire Bulls
	Preview; Report

Goldenacre Sports Ground
Referee: David Sutherland

=== Round 8 ===
24 September 2021
7.30pm

Southern Knights (Scotland)	42 - 29	(Scotland) Heriot's Rugby
	Preview; Report

The Greenyards
Referee: Ben Blain

25 September 2021
2pm

Boroughmuir Bears (Scotland)	17 - 27	(Scotland) Ayrshire Bulls
	Preview; Report

Meggetland Sports Complex
Referee: David Sutherland

26 September 2021
1.30pm

Stirling County (Scotland)	41 - 39	(Scotland) Watsonians
	Preview; Report

Bridgehaugh Park
Referee: Ian Kenny

=== Round 9 ===
2 October 2021
3pm

Heriot's Rugby (Scotland)	16 - 17	(Scotland) Stirling County
	Preview; Report

Goldenacre Sports Ground
Referee: Hollie Davidson

1 October 2021
7.30pm

Ayrshire Bulls (Scotland)	17 - 11	(Scotland) Southern Knights
	Preview; Report

Millbrae
Referee: Graeme Ormiston

3 October 2021
1.30pm

Watsonians (Scotland)	29 - 35	(Scotland) Boroughmuir Bears
	Preview

Myreside Stadium
Referee: Ian Kenny

=== Round 10 ===
9 October 2021

Heriot's Rugby (Scotland)	31 - 21	(Scotland) Boroughmuir Bears
	Report

Goldenacre Sports Ground
Referee: Finlay Brown (SRU)

9 October 2021

Southern Knights (Scotland)	36 - 7	(Scotland) Stirling County

The Greenyards

10 October 2021

Watsonians (Scotland)	43 - 14	(Scotland) Ayrshire Bulls

Myreside Stadium

== Play-offs ==
5th-6th place play-off

15 October 2021

Heriot's Rugby (Scotland)	15 - 21	(Scotland) Boroughmuir Bears
	Report

Goldenacre Sports Ground

3rd-4th place play-off

16 October 2021

Stirling County (Scotland)	19 - 21	(Scotland) Watsonians

Super 6 final

17 October 2021

Ayrshire Bulls (Scotland)	26 - 16	(Scotland) Southern Knights

== Team of the Tournament ==
The 2021–22 Super 6 team of the tournament was named as follows:-

Pos		Player	Team
FB	15	(Scotland) Matt Davidson	Ayrshire Bulls
RW	14	(Scotland) Jacob Henry	Southern Knights
OC	13	(Scotland) Archie Russell	Stirling Wolves
IC	12	(Scotland) Nyle Godsmark	Southern Knights
LW	11	(Scotland) Jordan Edmunds	Boroughmuir Bears
FH	10	(Australia) Tom Jordan	Ayrshire Bulls
SH	9	(Scotland) Kareem Barreto	Boroughmuir Bears
N8	8	(Scotland) Blair Macpherson	Ayrshire Bulls
OF	7	(Scotland) Connor Gordon	Stirling Wolves
BF	6	(Scotland) Harry Borthwick	Southern Knights
RL	5	(Scotland) Angus Runciman	Southern Knights
LL	4	(South Africa) Michael Badenhorst	Watsonians
TP	3	(Scotland) Euan McLaren	Southern Knights
HK	2	(Scotland) Fraser Renwick	Southern Knights
LP	1	(Scotland) Grant Thornton	Ayrshire Bulls
Substitutes
HK	16	(Australia) Reyner Kennedy	Stirling Wolves
LP	17	(Scotland) Michael Scott	Ayrshire Bulls
TP	18	(Scotland) George Breese	Stirling Wolves
LK	19	(Scotland) Tom Everard	Ayrshire Bulls
FL	20	(Scotland) Rhys Tait	Boroughmuir Bears
FH	21	(South Africa) Marc Morrison	Watsonians
FH	22	(Scotland) Grant Hughes	Stirling Wolves
CE	23	(Scotland) Tom Roche	Stirling Wolves

== Leading points scorers ==
To be determined.

== Leading try scorers ==
To be determined.
