= 2023–24 Super Series =

Rugby union Super Series Championship

- Countries: Scotland

The 2023–24 Super Series (previously known as the Super 6) is the fourth season of a semi-professional rugby union competition for Scotland's club sides.

The usual six teams competing in this season's Super Series are Ayrshire Bulls, Boroughmuir Bears, Heriot's Rugby, Stirling Wolves, Watsonians and Southern Knights. In addition, the league competition saw a Future XV sponsored by FOSROC, which comprised Scotland Under 20 players.

== Competition format ==
Super Series consists of 3 different competitions involving the same six teams, plus selectively a Future XV, a Glasgow Warriors 'A' side and an Edinburgh Rugby 'A' side.

=== Super Series Championship ===
League Stage : Weeks One to Ten

All 6 usual sides plus the Future XV will play each other home and away in a double round robin, using the rugby points system.

League play-offs

Semi-Finals : The top 4 teams play off determine the finalist slots.

Final : The winners of the semi-finals compete in the final of the Super 6 tournament.

== Table ==
2023–24 Super Series Table
	Team	P	W	D	L	PF	PA	PD	TBP	LBP	PTS
1	Heriot's Rugby	12	10	1	1	478	238	+240	10	0	52
2	Ayrshire Bulls (RU)	12	9	0	3	372	211	+151	8	0	47
3	Watsonians	12	9	0	3	265	231	+34	2	0	40
4	Stirling Wolves (CH)	12	6	0	6	422	286	+136	3	2	33
5	Southern Knights	12	4	1	7	282	369	-87	2	1	27
6	Boroughmuir Bears	12	3	0	9	252	389	-137	1	0	17
7	Future XV	12	0	0	12	206	543	-337	0	3	3
Yellow background indicates qualification for the final. Green background indicates semi-finalists. (CH) Champions. (RU) Runners-up.

== League stage rounds ==
All times are local.

=== Round 1 ===
28 July 2023
7.35pm

(1BP) Southern Knights (Scotland)	39 - 38	(Scotland) Future XV (2BP)
Try: Luke Thompson x 2 Aidan Cross; Donald Crawford x 2 Garry Young; Con: Callum Grieve x 3 Pen: Callum Grieve	Preview; Report	Try: Amena Caqusau; Callum Smyth; Freddy Douglas; Jake Spurway; Tom Smith; Oliver Duncan; Con: Isaac Coates x 4

Greenyards
Referee: Jonny Perriam (SRU)

28 July 2023
7.35pm

Boroughmuir Bears (Scotland)	14 - 51	(Scotland) Heriots (1BP)
Try: Jack Fisher; Josh King; Con: Gavin Lockhart; Callum Anderson	Preview; Report	Try: Iain Wilson; Bruce Houston; Charlie Jupp; Sinjin Broad; Lewis Wells; Matt Davidson x 2 Ross Jones; Con: Bruce Houston x 4 Pen: Bruce Houston

Meggetland Sports Complex
Referee: Ian Kenny (SRU)

29 July 2023
7.35pm

Ayrshire Bulls (Scotland)	3 - 11	(Scotland) Watsonians
Pen: Bradley Roderick-Evans	Preview; Report	Try: Kody McGovern; Pen: Jason Baggott x 2

Millbrae
Referee: Sam Grove-White (SRU)

== Semi-finals ==
10 November 2023
7.35pm

Heriots (Scotland)	21 - 26	(Scotland) Stirling Wolves
Try: Fin Campbell; Matt Davidson; Struan Cessford; Con: Ross Jones x 3	Preview; Report	Try: Connor Gordon x 2 Ed Hasdell; Ross McKnight; Con: Marcus Holden x 2 Craig Jackson

Goldenacre Sports Ground
Referee: Ruairidh Campbell (SRU)

11 November 2023
5pm

Ayrshire Bulls (Scotland)	38 - 22	(Scotland) Watsonians
Try: Jamie Shedden x 2 Luca Bardelli; Blair Macpherson; Jamie Drummond x 2 Con: Brad Roderick-Evans x 4	Preview; Report	Try: Connor McAlpine; Dom Coetzer; George Pringle; Con: Lee Millar x 2 Pen: Lee Millar

Millbrae
Referee: David Sutherland (SRU)

== Super Series final ==
18 November 2023
4.10pm

Ayrshire Bulls (Scotland)	19-29	(Scotland) Stirling Wolves
Try: B Beattie; E Bloodworth; O Horne; Con: B Rodrick-Evans (2)	Report	Try: E Hasdell; G Bryce (2); R McKnight (2); Con: M Holden (3)

Edinburgh Rugby Stadium
Attendance: 1,161
Referee: Ian Kenny (SRU)
