= Ross Mabon =

Rugby union referee

- Born: Ross Mabon c. 1998 Langholm, Scotland
- Occupation: Rugby union referee

Rugby union career
Refereeing career
Years	Competition	Apps
2016-	Scottish Premiership	
2019-	Super 6	

Ross Mabon is a professional rugby union referee who represents the Scottish Rugby Union.

== Rugby union career ==
=== Referee career ===
==== Professional career ====
Mabon moved into rugby union refereeing at the young age of 12, when a knee injury stalled his progress as a player.

He has refereed in the Scottish Premiership.

He has refereed in Scottish National Cup matches.

He refereed the U20 1872 Cup match between Glasgow Warriors and Edinburgh Rugby in 2019.

Mabon refereed his first Super 6 match on 23 November 2019 between Southern Knights and Ayrshire Bulls.

He is now part of the SRU Elite Referee Panel.

He has refereed in the Kings of the Sevens tournament.

==== International career ====
Mabon refereed in the Dubai Sevens in December 2016.

Mabon has refereed at international level. He took charge of the Rugby Europe Trophy match between Lithuania and Switzerland on 16 November 2019.

Mabon was also the Assistant Referee for the Poland v Netherlands match on 17 November 2018. He has also been Assistant Referee for the Women's Six Nations match between Scotland and Italy in 2019; and the U20 Six Nations match between France and Wales in 2019.
