= Michael Todd (rugby union) =

Scottish rugby union referee

Michael James Todd
- Born: Michael James Todd Hannover Germany
- Height: 187 cm (6 ft 2 in)
- Weight: 94 kg (207 lb)
- Occupation: Rugby union referee. Chartered Accountant

Rugby union career
Refereeing career
Years	Competition	Apps
2018-	Scottish Premiership	
2019-	Super 6	

Michael Todd is a professional rugby union referee who represents the Scottish Rugby Union.

== Rugby union career ==
=== Referee career ===
==== Professional career ====
He has refereed in the Scottish Premiership. He has also refereed in Scottish Varsity matches.

Todd refereed in his first Super 6 match on the 22 November 2019 when he took charge of Boroughmuir Bears v Heriot's Rugby.

He is a member of the Borders Referee Society. He is on the Scottish Rugby Union's Premier Panel of referees.

==== International career ====
Todd has been Assistant Referee for the Belgium v Georgia match in March 2019.

== Outside of rugby ==
Todd is an army reservist and is a trainee accountant.

He also has recently become a best man for an upcoming wedding. His chief role is to provide a speech and organise the stag do.
