= Mesu Dolokoto =

Fijian rugby union player (born 1995)

- Full name: Mesulame Vuwai Dolokoto
- Born: 21 January 1995 (age 31) Cakaudrove, Fiji
- Height: 181 cm (5 ft 11 in)
- Weight: 112 kg (247 lb; 17 st 9 lb)
- School: Queen Victoria School

Rugby union career
- Position: Hooker
- Current team: Fijian Drua
Amateur team(s)
Years	Team	Apps	(Points)
2020	Boroughmuir Bears	1	(5)
Senior career
Years	Team	Apps	(Points)
2018	Fijian Drua	9	(5)
2019	Fijian Latui	4	(10)
2020	Glasgow Warriors	3	(15)
2022–	Fijian Drua	35	(10)
2026	Manawatu	6	(0)
- Correct as of 3 October 2026
International career
Years	Team	Apps	(Points)
2018–2019	Fiji Warriors	4	(0)
2018–2024	Fiji	15	(10)
- Correct as of 16 November 2024

Mesulame Vuwai Dolokoto (born 21 January 1995) is a Fiji international rugby union player. He currently plays for the Fijian Drua in Super Rugby. He previously played for the Glasgow Warriors in the Pro14 competition.

== Rugby Union career ==
=== Professional career ===
He also trained with the Super Rugby side Brumbies during the 2015 season.

He also represented the Fijian Drua in the 2018 National Rugby Championship. His position of choice is hooker.

He joined Glasgow Warriors in 2019. He made his competitive debut for the club on 14 February 2020, scoring 2 tries on his debut against Zebre. He is Glasgow Warrior No. 309.

He played for the Boroughmuir Bears in the Super 6. He scored a try on his debut for the side on 19 January 2020.

He signed with Fijian Drua again in 2021, ahead of their inaugural season in Super Rugby.
