= 2018–19 Rugby Europe International Championships =

- Date: September 2018 – June 2019
- Countries: 35

Tournament statistics
- Champions: Championship; Georgia (11); Trophy; Portugal (3); Conference 1 Ukraine (1); Malta (3); Conference 2 Latvia (2); Slovenia (2); Development; Turkey (1)
- Antim Cup: Georgia (12th title)
- Matches played: 72
- Attendance: 114,468 (1,590 per match)
- Tries scored: 454 (6.31 per match)
- Top point scorer(s): Championship (Romania) Florin Vlaicu (34); Trophy (Portugal) Jorge Abecassis (49); Conference (Bulgaria) Petar Nikolov (60); Development (Turkey) Mihraç Ertürk (24)
- Top try scorer(s): Championship (Georgia (country)) Mirian Modebadze (4); Trophy (Portugal) João Belo (5) (Portugal) Rodrigo Marta (5); Conference (Bulgaria) Ivayilo Ivanov (4) (Andorra) Edisher Jamrulidze (4) (Slovenia) Blaž Pilko (4); Development (Turkey) Mihraç Ertürk (4)
- Official website: Rugby Europe

The 2018–19 Rugby Europe International Championships is the European Championship for tier 2 and tier 3 rugby union nations. The 2018–19 season is the third of its new format and structure, where all Levels play on a one-year cycle, replacing the old format of a two-year cycle, with the teams playing each other both home and away.

After the eligibility controversy of the 2018 Championship season, and the following points deduction, Romania faced and defeated Portugal in the relegation play-off to determine the last competitor for the 2019 Championship edition.

== Countries ==
Pre-tournament World Rugby rankings in parentheses. Trophy as of 24 September 2018, Conferences as of 8 October 2018 and Championship rankings as of 4 February 2019. After winning the relegation play-off between the winner of the 2018 Trophy, Portugal, and the last placed 2018 Championship team, Romania, and the win by the latter Portugal remained on the Trophy level, whereas Romania stayed inside the Championship. Following the 2017–18 season and the promotion of Bulgaria as well as the relegation of Estonia, Rugby Europe reallocated Austria from Conference 2 South to Conference 2 North for the 2018–19 Conference season.

Championship

- Belgium (25)
- Georgia * (13)
- Germany (26)
- Russia (19)
- Spain (21)
- Romania ‡ (18)

Conference 1
North

- Hungary (68)
- Luxembourg ↑ (64)
- Moldova ↓ (44)
- Sweden (56)
- Ukraine (37)

Conference 2
North

- Austria (75)
- Denmark (79)
- Finland (99)
- Latvia ↓ (59)
- Norway (96)

Development

- Estonia ↓
- Turkey

Trophy

- Czech Republic (32)
- Lithuania ↑ (34)
- Netherlands (27)
- Poland (35)
- Portugal • (24)
- Switzerland (33)

South

- Bosnia and Herzegovina (71)
- Croatia (55)
- Cyprus ↑ (NR)
- Israel (58)
- Malta • (40)

South

- Andorra ↓ (70)
- Bulgaria ↑ (94)
- Serbia (82)
- Slovakia ‡ (NR)
- Slovenia (77)

Legend:
* Champion of 2017–18 season; ↑ Promoted from lower division during 2017–18 season; • Division Champion but not promoted during 2017–18 season; ‡ Last place inside own division but not relegated during 2017–18 season; ↓ Relegated from higher division during 2017–18 season

== 2019 Rugby Europe Championship ==
Champions
Advances to promotion/
relegation play-off

Pos.	Team	Games				Points			Tries			TBP	LBP	GS	Table points
Pos.	Team	Played	Won	Drawn	Lost	For	Against	Diff	For	Against	Diff	TBP	LBP	GS	Table points
1	Georgia	5	5	0	0	162	34	+128	25	2	+23	3	0	1	24
2	Spain	5	4	0	1	127	75	+52	18	9	+9	2	0	0	18
3	Romania	5	3	0	2	130	86	+44	14	12	+2	2	1	0	15
4	Russia	5	2	0	3	130	85	+45	20	8	+12	1	2	0	11
5	Belgium	5	1	0	4	68	222	-154	8	33	-25	0	0	0	4
6	Germany	5	0	0	5	63	178	-115	7	28	-21	0	1	0	1
Points were awarded to the teams as follows: Win – 4 points | Draw – 2 points | At least 3 or more tries than opponent – 1 point | Loss within 7 points – 1 point | Loss greater than 7 points – 0 points | Completing a Grand Slam – 1 point

Matches

9 February 2019
16:00 EET (UTC+02)

Romania	9 - 18	Georgia
	Gamesheet

Cluj Arena, Cluj
Attendance: 1,500
Referee: (Ireland) Sean Gallagher

9 February 2019
15:00 CET (UTC+01)

Belgium	29 - 22	Germany (1 LBP)
	Gamesheet

King Baudouin Stadium – Annex 2, Brussels
Attendance: 4,000
Referee: (Georgia (country)) Shota Tevzadze

10 February 2019
13:00 CET (UTC+01)

Spain	16 - 14	Russia (1 LBP)
	Gamesheet

Estadio Nacional Complutense, Madrid
Attendance: 5,800
Referee: (Ireland) Joy Neville

16 February 2019
14:00 MSK (UTC+03)

(1 TBP) Russia	64-7	Belgium
	Gamesheet

Slava Metreveli Central Stadium, Sochi
Attendance: 3,000
Referee: (Romania) Cristian Serban

16 February 2019
15:00 EET (UTC+02)

(1 TBP) Romania	38-10	Germany
	Gamesheet

Stadionul Municipal, Botoşani
Attendance: n.a.
Referee: (Georgia (country)) Nika Amashukeli

16 February 2019
16:00 GET (UTC+03)

Georgia	24-10	Spain
	Gamesheet

Avchala Stadium, Tbilisi
Attendance: 3,000
Referee: (England) Christopher Ridley

2 March 2019
15:00 CET (UTC+01)

Germany	18-26	Russia
	Gamesheet

Fritz-Grunebaum-Sportpark, Heidelberg
Attendance: 2,100
Referee: (France) Ludovic Cayre

2 March 2019
16:00 CET (UTC+01)

Belgium	6-46	Georgia (1 TBP)
	Gamesheet

King Baudouin Stadium - Annex 2, Brussels
Attendance: 2,000
Referee: (Scotland) Ben Blain

3 March 2019
13:00 CET (UTC+01)

Spain	21-18	Romania (1 LBP)
	Gamesheet

Estadio Nacional Complutense, Madrid
Attendance: 6,900
Referee: (Wales) Adam Jones

9 March 2019
17:00 EET (UTC+02)

Romania	22-20	Russia (1 LBP)
	Gamesheet

Stadionul Municipal, Botoşani
Attendance: 1,200
Referee: (France) Thomas Charabas

10 March 2019
13:00 CET (UTC+01)

(1 TBP) Spain	47-9	Belgium
	Gamesheet

Estadio Nacional Complutense, Madrid
Attendance: 8,100
Referee: (Italy) Marius Mitrea

10 March 2019
16:00 GET (UTC+04)

(1 TBP) Georgia	52-3	Germany
	Gamesheet

AIA Arena, Kutaisi
Attendance: 6,000
Referee: (Scotland) Keith Allen

17 March 2019
15:00 MSK (UTC+03)

Russia	6-22	Georgia (1 TBP)
	Gamesheet

Kuban Stadium, Krasnodar
Attendance: 5,850
Referee: (England) Tom Foley

17 March 2019
13:00 CET (UTC+01)

Germany	10-33	Spain (1 TBP)
	Gamesheet

Sportpark Höhenberg, Köln
Attendance: 2,000
Referee: (Italy) Andrea Piardi

17 March 2019
13:00 CET (UTC+01)

Belgium	17-43	Romania (1 TBP)
	Gamesheet

King Baudouin Stadium – Annex 2, Brussels
Attendance: 3,000
Referee: (Wales) Craig Evans

== 2018–19 Rugby Europe Trophy ==
Champions and
advances to promotion/
relegation play-off
Relegated

Place	Nation	Games				Points			Tries			Table points
Place	Nation	Played	Won	Drawn	Lost	For	Against	Diff	For	Against	Diff	Table points
1	Portugal	5	5	0	0	272	31	+241	4	0	1	25
2	Netherlands	5	4	0	1	164	58	+106	2	0	0	18
3	Switzerland	5	3	0	2	108	138	−20	0	0	0	12
4	Poland	5	2	0	3	104	164	-60	1	1	0	10
5	Lithuania	5	1	0	4	63	175	−112	1	0	0	5
6	Czech Republic	5	0	0	5	59	205	−146	0	1	0	1
Points were awarded to the teams as follows: Win – 4 points : Draw – 2 points : Loss within 7 points – 1 point : Loss greater than 7 points – 0 points: At least 3 more tries than opponent – 1 point Completing a Grand Slam – 1 point

Matches

29 September 2018
16:00 CEST (UTC+02)

Czech Republic	22–41	Poland
	Gamesheet

Stadion Mládeže, Zlín
Attendance: 500
Referee: Stuart Gaffikin (Ireland)

13 October 2018
14:00 EEST (UTC+03)

(1 TBP) Lithuania	30–10	Czech Republic
	Gamesheet

Šiaulių savivaldybės stadionas, Šiauliai
Attendance: 1,000
Referee: Pedro Mendes Silva (Portugal)

3 November 2018
18:00 CET (UTC+01)

(1 TBP) Poland	33–0	Lithuania
	Gamesheet

Stadion Miejski, Łódź
Attendance: 2,155
Referee: Gianluca Gnecchi (Italy)

17 November 2018
15:00 CET (UTC+01)

Switzerland	17–5	Czech Republic
	Gamesheet

Stade Municipal, Yverdon-les-Bains
Attendance: 2,000
Referee: Maxime Burlet (Belgium)

17 November 2018
18:00 CET (UTC+01)

Poland	0–49	Netherlands (1 TBP)
	Gamesheet

Arena Lublin, Lublin
Attendance: 4,000
Referee: Keith Allen (Scotland)

24 November 2018
15:00 CET (UTC+01)

Netherlands	36–15	Switzerland
	Gamesheet

NRCA Stadium, Amsterdam
Attendance: 1,400
Referee: Shota Tevzadze (Georgia (country))

16 February 2019
15:00 WET (UTC+00)

(1 TBP) Portugal	65-5	Poland
	Gamesheet

Complexo Municipal de Atletismo, Setúbal
Attendance: n.a.
Referee: (Italy) Manuel Bottino

9 March 2019
15:00 CET (UTC+01)

Netherlands	5-18	Portugal
	Gamesheet

NRCA Stadium, Amsterdam
Attendance: 7,000
Referee: (Belgium) Maxime Burlet

16 March 2019
15:30 CET (UTC+01)

Switzerland	14-48	Portugal (1 TBP)
	Gamesheet

Centre sportif de Colovray, Nyon
Attendance: 2,107
Referee: (Spain) Inigo Atorrasagasti

16 March 2019
15:00 CET (UTC+01)

(1 LBP) Czech Republic	22-24	Netherlands
	Gamesheet

Tarta Arena, Smíchov
Attendance: 850
Referee: (Portugal) Paulo Duarte

23 March 2019
15:00 WET (UTC+00)

(1 TBP) Portugal	93-0	Czech Republic
	Gamesheet

Complexo Desportivo, Caldas da Rainha
Attendance: n.a
Referee: (France) Tual Trainini

23 March 2019
18:00 CET (UTC+01)

(1 LBP) Poland	25-28	Switzerland
	Gamesheet

Stadion Miejski, Łódź
Attendance: 2,500
Referee: (Romania) Vlad Iordăchescu

6 April 2019
17:00 EEST (UTC+03)

Lithuania	7-48	Portugal (1 TBP)
	Gamesheet

Sporto centras, Jurbarkas
Attendance: 1,700
Referee: (France) Jonathan Dufort

13 April 2019
15:00 CEST (UTC+02)

Switzerland	34–24	Lithuania
	Gamesheet

Stadion Breite, Schaffhausen
Attendance: 1,309
Referee: (Wales) Alad Evans

8 June 2019
17:00 EEST (UTC+03)

Lithuania	3–50	Netherlands
	Gamesheet

Panevėžio kūno kultūros ir sporto centras, Panevėžys
Attendance: n/a
Referee: (Republic of Ireland) Jonathan Erskine

== 2018–19 Rugby Europe Conference ==
=== Conference 1 ===
==== Conference 1 North ====
Champions and promoted to
2019–20 Rugby Europe Trophy
Relegated

Pos.	Team	Games				Points			TBP	LBP	GS	Table points
Pos.	Team	Played	Won	Drawn	Lost	For	Against	Diff	TBP	LBP	GS	Table points
1	Ukraine	4	3	0	1	113	29	+84	1	1	0	14
2	Sweden	4	3	0	1	140	65	+75	1	0	0	13
3	Luxembourg	4	2	0	2	63	59	+4	1	1	0	9
4	Hungary	4	1	0	3	97	118	-21	1	1	0	6
5	Moldova	4	1	0	3	49	147	-98	0	0	0	4
Points were awarded to the teams as follows: Win – 4 points : Draw – 2 points : Loss within 7 points – 1 point : Loss greater than 7 points – 0 points: At least 3 more tries than opponent – 1 point Completing a Grand Slam – 1 point

Matches

13 October 2018
14:00 EEST (UTC+03)

Ukraine	24–13	Luxembourg
	Gamesheet

Yunist' Stadium, Lviv
Attendance: 250
Referee: (Romania) Cristian Serban

20 October 2018
14:00 CEST (UTC+02)

(1 TBP) Sweden	80–6	Moldova
	Gamesheet

Bollspelaren, Norrköping
Attendance: 400
Referee: (Netherlands) Gert Visser

3 November 2018
16:00 EET (UTC+02)

Moldova	16–31	Hungary (1 TBP)
	Gamesheet

Stadionul Raional, Anenii Noi
Attendance: 200
Referee: (Georgia (country)) Tornike Gvirjishvili

3 November 2018
16:00 CET (UTC+01)

(1 LBP) Luxembourg	9–10	Sweden
	Gamesheet

Stade Josy Barthel, Luxembourg City
Attendance: 1,400
Referee: (Switzerland) Yann Benoît

10 November 2018
14:00 CET (UTC+01)

Hungary	24–48	Ukraine (1 TBP)
	Gamesheet

Városi Szabadidő Központ, Százhalombatta
Attendance: 600
Referee: (Germany) Dan O'Connell

13 April 2019
16:00 CEST (UTC+02)

Luxembourg	23-10	Moldova
	Gamesheet

Stade Josy Barthel, Luxembourg City
Attendance: 1,200
Referee: (Germany) Killian O'BRIEN

20 April 2019
13:00 EEST (UTC+03)

Moldova	17-13	Ukraine (1 LBP)
	Gamesheet

Stadionul Central orașului, Drochia
Attendance: 500
Referee: (Croatia) Bartolic Hrvoje

4 May 2019
14:00 CEST (UTC+02)

(1 LBP) Hungary	15-18	Luxembourg
	Gamesheet

Városi Szabadidő Központ, Százhalombatta
Attendance: 200
Referee: (Portugal) Pedro Cardios M. Silva

11 May 2019
15:00 CEST (UTC+02)

Sweden	36-27	Hungary
	Gamesheet

Bollspelaren, Norrköping
Attendance: 600
Referee: (Russia) Alexei Bryzgalin

19 May 2019
16:00 EEST (UTC+03)

Ukraine	23-14	Sweden
	Gamesheet

Spartak Stadium, Odesa
Attendance: 2,200
Referee: (Wales) Mike English

==== Conference 1 South ====
Champions
Relegated

Pos.	Team	Games				Points			TBP	LBP	GS	Table points
Pos.	Team	Played	Won	Drawn	Lost	For	Against	Diff	TBP	LBP	GS	Table points
1	Malta	4	3	1	0	117	49	+68	2	0	0	16
2	Croatia	4	3	1	0	123	69	+54	2	0	0	16
3	Israel	4	2	0	2	104	62	+42	1	2	0	11
4	Cyprus	4	1	0	3	79	139	−60	0	0	0	4
5	Bosnia and Herzegovina	4	0	0	4	40	144	−104	0	1	0	1
Points were awarded to the teams as follows: Win – 4 points : Draw – 2 points : Loss within 7 points – 1 point : Loss greater than 7 points – 0 points: At least 3 more tries than opponent – 1 point Completing a Grand Slam – 1 point

Matches

13 October 2018
19:00 CEST (UTC+02)

Bosnia and Herzegovina	11–40	Croatia (1 TBP)
	Gamesheet

Stadion Kamberovića polje, Zenica
Attendance: 1,000
Referee: (Czech Republic) Matej Razga

20 October 2018
16:00 CEST (UTC+02)

(1 TBP) Croatia	46–24	Cyprus
	Gamesheet

Stadion Stari plac, Split
Attendance: n.a.
Referee: (Italy) Manuel Bottino

20 October 2018
14:00 IDT (UTC+03)

(1 LBP) Israel	14–21	Malta
	Gamesheet

Wingate Institute, Netanya
Attendance: n.a.
Referee: (Belgium) John Catteau

27 October 2018
14:00 CEST (UTC+02)

(1 TBP) Malta	41–7	Bosnia and Herzegovina
	Gamesheet

Hibernians Stadium, Paola
Attendance: 1,500
Referee: (Monaco) Anthony Lac

27 October 2018
15:00 CEST (UTC+02)

Croatia	19–16	Israel (1 LBP)
	Gamesheet

Stadion NŠC Stjepan Spajić, Zagreb
Attendance: n.a.
Referee: (Wales) Ben Breakspear

10 November 2018
15:00 EET (UTC+02)

Cyprus	22–34	Israel
	Gamesheet

Stelios Kyriakides Stadium, Paphos
Attendance: n.a.
Referee: (Spain) Jorge Molpeceres

16 March 2018
15:00 IST (UTC+02)

(1 TBP) Israel	40–0	Bosnia and Herzegovina
	Gamesheet

Wingate Institute, Netanya
Attendance: 500
Referee: (Switzerland) Ethan Glass

23 March 2018
15:00 EET (UTC+02)

Cyprus	10-37	Malta (1 TBP)
	Gamesheet

Stelios Kyriakides Stadium, Paphos
Attendance: 700
Referee: (Scotland) Hollie Davidson

6 April 2019
15:00 CEST (UTC+02)

(1 LBP) Bosnia and Herzegovina	22-23	Cyprus
	Gamesheet

Stadion Kamberovića polje, Zenica
Attendance: 250
Referee: (Russia) Georgii Kopp

13 April 2019
14:00 CEST (UTC+02)

Malta	18-18	Croatia
	Gamesheet

Hibernians Stadium, Paola
Attendance: 1,800
Referee: (Spain) Jorge Molpeceres

=== Conference 2 ===
==== Conference 2 North ====
Champions and promoted
Possible relegation

Pos.	Team	Games				Points			TBP	LBP	GS	Table points
Pos.	Team	Played	Won	Drawn	Lost	For	Against	Diff	TBP	LBP	GS	Table points
1	Latvia	4	4	0	0	118	43	+75	3	0	1	20
2	Finland	4	3	0	1	95	93	+2	0	0	0	12
3	Denmark	4	2	0	2	100	77	+23	2	1	0	11
4	Norway	4	1	0	3	54	112	−58	0	0	0	4
5	Austria	4	0	0	4	62	104	−42	0	3	0	3
Points were awarded to the teams as follows: Win – 4 points : Draw – 2 points : Loss within 7 points – 1 point : Loss greater than 7 points – 0 points: At least 3 more tries than opponent – 1 point Completing a Grand Slam – 1 point

Matches

13 October 2018
15:00 EEST (UTC+03)

Finland	22–18	Denmark (1 LBP)
	Gamesheet

Myllypuron urheilupuisto, Helsinki
Attendance: 300
Referee: (Sweden) Jacob Bäverstam

13 October 2018
15:00 CEST (UTC+02)

Norway	9–6	Austria (1 LBP)
	Gamesheet

Fana Stadion, Bergen
Attendance: 300
Referee: (Belgium) Nicolas Vandecauter

20 October 2018
15:00 EEST (UTC+03)

(1 TBP) Latvia	24–7	Finland
	Gamesheet

Daugavas stadions, Riga
Attendance: 500
Referee: (Romania) Alexandru Ionescu

27 October 2018
17:00 CEST (UTC+02)

(1 TBP) Denmark	42–10	Norway
	Gamesheet

Atletikstadion, Odense
Attendance: 1,000
Referee: (Poland) Lukasz Jasiński

27 October 2018
19:00 CEST (UTC+02)

(1 LBP) Austria	20–26	Latvia
	Gamesheet

Wiener Sportclub-Platz, Wien
Attendance: 1,000
Referee: (Germany) Killian O'Brien

30 March 2019
18:00 CET (UTC+01)

(1 LBP) Austria	29-32	Finland
	Gamesheet

Wiener Sportclub-Platz, Wien
Attendance: 500
Referee: (Serbia) Dejean Stligic

27 April 2019
16:00 CEST (UTC+02)

(1 TBP) Denmark	37-7	Austria
	Gamesheet

Atletikstadion, Odense
Attendance: 857
Referee: (Monaco) Anthony Lac

4 May 2019
17:00 EEST (UTC+03)

(1 TBP) Latvia	38-3	Denmark
	Gamesheet

Baldone Stadium, Baldone
Attendance: 350
Referee: (Switzerland) Ethan Glass

25 May 2019
16:00 CEST (UTC+02)

Norway	13-30	Latvia (1 TBP)
	Gamesheet

Kanalbanen, Horten Rugby Klubb, Horten
Attendance: n/a
Referee: (Sweden) Rami Aro

1 June 2019
17:00 EEST (UTC+03)

Finland	34-22	Norway
	Gamesheet

Myllypuron urheilupuisto, Helsinki
Attendance: 110
Referee: (Netherlands) Gert Visser

==== Conference 2 South ====
Champions and promoted
Relegated

Pos.	Team	Games				Points			TBP	LBP	GS	Table points
Pos.	Team	Played	Won	Drawn	Lost	For	Against	Diff	TBP	LBP	GS	Table points
1	Slovenia	4	3	0	1	191	67	+124	2	0	0	14
2	Bulgaria	4	3	0	1	125	98	+27	0	0	0	12
3	Serbia	4	2	0	2	101	105	-4	1	1	0	10
4	Andorra	4	2	0	2	94	103	−9	1	0	0	9
5	Slovakia	4	0	0	4	53	191	−138	0	0	0	0
Points were awarded to the teams as follows: Win – 4 points : Draw – 2 points : Loss within 7 points – 1 point : Loss greater than 7 points – 0 points: At least 3 more tries than opponent – 1 point Completing a Grand Slam – 1 point

Matches

13 October 2018
15:00 CEST (UTC+02)

(1 LBP) Serbia	29–35	Bulgaria
	Gamesheet

Stadion Kralj Petar Prvi, Beograd
Attendance: n.a.
Referee: (Czech Republic) Stepan Cekal

20 October 2018
14:00 CEST (UTC+02)

(1 TBP) Slovenia	48–14	Andorra
	Gamesheet

Rugby stadion OVAL, Ljubljana
Attendance: 400
Referee: (Croatia) Hrvoje Bartolić

27 October 2018
16:00 CEST (UTC+02)

Bulgaria	13–25	Slovenia
	Gamesheet

NSA Vassil Levski, Sofia
Attendance: 600
Referee: (Serbia) Dejan Stiglic

3 November 2018
17:00 CET (UTC+01)

Andorra	27–14	Slovakia
	Gamesheet

Estadi Nacional, Andorra la Vella
Attendance: 400
Referee: (Israel) Ariel Cabral

10 November 2018
14:00 CET (UTC+01)

Slovakia	10–37	Serbia (1 TBP)
	Gamesheet

Štadión PFK, Piešťany
Attendance: 200
Referee: (Denmark) Mike Hawkins

20 April 2019
17:00 CEST (UTC+02)

Slovakia	24-36	Bulgaria
	Gamesheet

Štadión PFK, Piešťany
Attendance: 200
Referee: (Russia) Alexei Lebedev

11 May 2019
14:00 CEST (UTC+02)

Serbia	35-27	Slovenia
	Gamesheet

Stadion Borca, Starčevo
Attendance: 400
Referee: (Israel) Ariel Cabral

11 May 2019
17:00 EEST (UTC+03)

Bulgaria	41-20	Andorra
	Gamesheet

NSA Vassil Levski, Sofia
Attendance: 800
Referee: (Denmark) Mike Hawkins

18 May 2019
15:00 CEST (UTC+02)

(1 TBP) Slovenia	91-5	Slovakia
	Gamesheet

Rugby stadion OVAL, Ljubljana
Attendance: 300
Referee: (Czech Republic) Matej Razga

18 May 2019
18:00 CEST (UTC+02)

(1 TBP) Andorra	33-0	Serbia
	Gamesheet

Estadi Nacional, Andorra la Vella
Attendance: 600
Referee: (Portugal) Jao Costa

== 2019 Rugby Europe Development ==
Champions and promoted

Pos.	Team	Games				Points			TBP	LBP	GS	Table points
Pos.	Team	Played	Won	Drawn	Lost	For	Against	Diff	TBP	LBP	GS	Table points
1	Turkey	2	2	0	0	104	39	+65	2	0	1	11
2	Estonia	2	0	0	2	39	104	-65	0	0	0	0
Points were awarded to the teams as follows: Win – 4 points : Draw – 2 points : Loss within 7 points – 1 point : Loss greater than 7 points – 0 points: At least 3 more tries than opponent – 1 point Completing a Grand Slam – 1 point

Matches

20 April 2019
13:00 TRT (UTC+03)

(1 TBP) Turkey	61-20	Estonia
	Gamesheet

Atatürk Olympic Stadium (Athletics venue), Istanbul
Attendance: 500
Referee: (Moldova) Eugeniu Procopi

25 May 2019
16:00 EEST (UTC+03)

Estonia	19-43	Turkey (1 TBP)
	Gamesheet

Kalevi Central Stadium, Tallinn
Attendance: 130
Referee: (Hungary) Norbert Mátrai

== Play-off ==
=== Championship–Trophy promotion play-off ===
15 June 2019
13:50 CET (UTC+01)

Germany	32 – 37	Portugal
Try: 4 Con: 3 Pen: 2 Drop: 0	Gamesheet	Try: 4 Con: 4 Pen: 3 Drop: 0

Frankfurt
Attendance: 800
Referee: (Ireland) Sean Gallagher
