= 1982 Fiji rugby union tour of Great Britain and Canada =

Athletic competition

Summary
P	W	D	L
Total
12	2	0	10
Test match
2	0	0	2
Opponent
P	W	D	L
Scotland XV
1	0	0	1
England XV
1	0	0	1

The 1982 Fiji rugby union tour of Great Britain and Canada was a series of matches played between September and October 1982 and by Fiji national rugby union team, in Scotland, England and Canada.

A match against Scotland and another against England were played, but Scottish Rugby Union and Rugby Football Union did not award full international caps.

== Results ==
Scores and results list Fiji's points tally first.

Opposing Team	For	Against	Date	Venue	Status
Edinburgh	12	47	15 September 1982	Myreside, Edinburgh	Tour match
South of Scotland	17	23	18 September 1982	Hawick	Tour match
Anglo Scots	19	29	21 September 1982	Glasgow	Tour match
Scotland XV	12	32	25 September 1982	Murrayfield, Edinburgh	Test match
Northern Division	4	19	29 September 1982	Workington	Tour match
SW Division	6	36	2 October 1982	Redruth	Tour match
Midlands	16	25	6 October 1982	Leicester	Tour match
Cambridge University	12	30	9 October 1982	Cambridge	Tour match
England Students	9	26	12 October 1982	Bristol	Tour match
England XV	19	60	16 October 1982	Twickenham, London	Test match
Vancouver XV	25	3	20 October 1982	Vancouver	Tour match
Vancouver Dogwood	42	21	23 October 1982	Vancouver	Tour match

== Sources ==
- Vivian Jenkins, ed. (1982). Rothmans Rugby Yearbook 1982–83. Rothmans Publications Ltd. pp. 68–69. ISBN 0907574130.
