= Graeme Ormiston =

- Born: Graeme Ormiston Galashiels, Scotland
- Occupation: Rugby union referee

Rugby union career
Refereeing career
Years	Competition	Apps
2014-	Scottish Premiership	
2019-	Super 6	

Graeme Ormiston is a professional rugby union referee who represents the Scottish Rugby Union.

== Rugby union career ==
=== Referee career ===
==== Professional career ====
Ormiston is a referee on the Borders Rugby Referees Society.

He has refereed in the Scottish Premiership.

Ormiston refereed his first Super 6 match on 14 December 2019 between Heriot's Rugby and Southern Knights.

He is now part of the SRU Premier Referee Panel.

He has refereed in the Kings of the Sevens tournament.

Ormiston has been Assistant Referee in the European Challenge Cup.

Ormiston has been Assistant Referee in the Pro14.

==== International career ====
He was named as an official in the 2019 Rugby World Cup.

He was Assistant Referee in the Romania v Belgium match on 10 March 2018 in the 2018 Rugby Europe Championship.

He was Assistant Referee in the Russia v Spain match on 10 March 2019 in the 2019 Rugby Europe Championship.

== Cricket career ==
He was registered as a player for Gala Cricket club.
