= 2019–20 Rugby Europe Trophy =

2019-20 Rugby Europe Trophy
- Date: 26 October 2019 – 7 March 2020
- Countries: Germany; Lithuania; Netherlands; Poland; Switzerland; Ukraine

Tournament statistics
- Matches played: 6
- Attendance: 8,631 (1,439 per match)
- Tries scored: 36 (6 per match)
- Top point scorer(s): (Netherlands) David Weersma (34)
- Top try scorer(s): (Netherlands) Joshua Gascoigne (4) (Netherlands) Jordy Hop (4)
- Official website: 2019–20 Rugby Europe International Championships

The 2019–20 Rugby Europe Trophy is the second-level rugby union competition below the premier Championship. It is the fourth Trophy competition under its new format, that will see Lithuania, Netherlands, Poland, and Switzerland compete for the title, and a place in the Championship–Trophy promotion play-off.

This year's competition sees Ukraine joining the Trophy after winning its division in Conference 1 North. After the Championship–Trophy promotion play-off of the 2018–19 season, which was played on 15 June 2019 between Portugal and Germany, Portugal was promoted after its third try and Germany relegated to the Trophy level.

== Table ==
Champions and advances to
Promotion/relegation play-off

Pos.	Team	Games				Points			Tries			Table points
Pos.	Team	Played	Won	Drawn	Lost	For	Against	Diff	For	Against	Diff	Table points
1	Netherlands (25)	5	4	1	0	144	38	+106	3	0	0	21
2	Switzerland (30)	5	2	2	1	93	52	+41	1	1	0	14
3	Ukraine (38)	5	2	2	1	60	74	−19	2	0	0	14
4	Germany (28)	5	1	2	2	62	85	−23	0	0	0	8
5	Lithuania (37)	5	1	1	3	61	103	−42	1	0	0	7
6	Poland (35)	5	1	0	4	44	112	−68	0	1	0	5
Pre-tournament rankings in parentheses. Points were awarded to the teams as follows: Win – 4 points | Draw – 2 points | Loss – 0 points Match bonus points: Scoring at least 3 more tries than the opponent – 1 point | Losing by 7 points or less – 1 point | Overall bonus point: Completing a Grand Slam (winning all matches) – 1 point

== Fixtures ==
26 October 2019
13:52 EEST (UTC+03)

(1 TBP) Ukraine	27–10	Lithuania
Try: Vertyletskyi (2) 30' c, 40'+1 m Radchuk 66' m Kosariev 80'+4 c Con: Kosariev (2/4) 30', 80'+4; Pen: Kosariev 10'	Gamesheet	Try: Miezys 35' c Con: Vilimavičius (1/1) 35'; Pen: Vilimavičius 19'

Dynamo Stadium, Kharkiv
Attendance: 500
Referee: Federico Vedovelli (Italy)

2 November 2019
14:52 CET (UTC+01)

Poland	15–35	Germany
Try: Buczek 40' m Cal 55' c Con: Gdula (1/2) 55'; Pen: Gdula (1) 7'	Gamesheet	Try: Rinklin 29' c Lammers (2) 35' c, 40' m Paine 72' c Con: Klewinghaus (3/4) 29', 35', 72'; Pen: Klewinghaus (3) 2', 22', 60'

Stadion Miejski, Łódź
Attendance: 1,500
Referee: Shota Tezvadze (Georgia)

9 November 2019
14:55 CET (UTC+01)

(1 TBP) Netherlands	64–8	Ukraine
Try: Hop (2) 21' c, 60' m Gascoigne (4) 32' c, 44' c, 66' c, 75' c Koning 39' c Danen 50' c Visser 63' c Con: Weersma (8/9) 22', 33', 40', 45', 51', 64', 67', 76'; Pen: Weersma 13'	Gamesheet	Try: Shakura 7' m Pen: Kosariev 15'

NRCA Stadium, Amsterdam
Attendance: 1,400
Referee: Jonathan Dufort (France)

16 November 2019
13:52 EET (UTC+02)

Lithuania	9–40	Switzerland (1 TBP)
Pen: Vilimavičius (3/3) 6', 15', 19'	Gamesheet	Try: Kavanagh 9' c Heinrich 12' m O'Grady 39' c Wullschleger 48' c Perrod 55' c Penalty try 72'; Con: Perrod (4/5) 10', 40', 49', 56

Šiaulių savivaldybės stadionas, Šiauliai
Attendance: 1,000
Referee: Ross Mabon (Scotland)

23 November 2019
15:22 CET (UTC+01)

(1 LBP) Switzerland	20–23	Poland
Try: Delabays 25' c Malyon 57' c Con: Perrod (2/2) 26', 58'; Pen: Perrod (2) 2', 14'	Gamesheet	Try: Pogorzelski 67' m Pen: Nowicki (6) 10', 18', 42', 53', 61', 74'

Stade Municipal, Yverdon-les-Bains
Attendance: 1,500
Referee: Robert O'Sullivan (Ireland)

23 November 2019
14:22 CET (UTC+01)

Germany	7–37	Netherlands (1 TBP)
Try: Fairhurst 14' c Con: Hohl (1/1) 15'	Gamesheet	Try: Hop (2) 10' c, 78' c Van Kampen 65' c Penalty try 80'; Con: Weersma (3/3) 11', 66', 79'; Pen: Weersma 20', 55', 62'

Fritz-Grunebaum-Sportpark, Heidelberg
Attendance: 2,731
Referee: Inigo Atorrasagasti (Spain)

29 February 2020
14:50 CET (UTC+01)

Germany	20–33	Switzerland
	Gamesheet

Fritz-Grunebaum-Sportpark, Heidelberg
Attendance: 650
Referee: Saba Abulashvili (Georgia)

29 February 2020
14:50 CET (UTC+01)

Netherlands	7–6	Poland (1 LBP)
	Gamesheet

NRCA Stadium, Amsterdam
Attendance: 2,050
Referee: Killian O'Brian (Germany)

7 March 2020
14:50 CET (UTC+01)

(1 TBP) Netherlands	36–17	Lithuania
	Gamesheet

NRCA Stadium, Amsterdam
Attendance: 2,000
Referee: Joao Costa (Portugal)

14 March 2020
15:30 CET (UTC+01)

Switzerland	0–0	Netherlands

Stade des Cherpines, Plan-les-Ouates
Referee: John Catteau (Belgium)

21 March 2020
15:00 CET (UTC+01)

Germany	0–0	Lithuania

Fritz-Grunebaum-Sportpark, Heidelberg
Referee: Ethan Glass (Switzerland)

18 April 2020
14:00 EEST (UTC+03)

(1 TBP) Lithuania	25–0	Poland

Lithuania
Referee: Matej Razga (Czech Republic)

25 April 2020
15:00 CEST (UTC+02)

Poland	0–25	Ukraine (1 TBP)

Stadion Miejski, Siedlce
Referee: Alexei Lebedev (Russia)

2 May 2020
13:00 EEST (UTC+03)

Ukraine	0–0	Switzerland

Yunist Stadion, Lviv
Referee: Anthony Lac (Monaco)

17 May 2020
14:00 EEST (UTC+03)

Ukraine	0–0	Germany

Spartak Stadium, Odesa
Referee: Alexandru Ionescu (Romania)

== Relegation/promotion play-off ==
29 May 2021
14:00 CEST (UTC+02)

Belgium	21–23	Netherlands

ASUB Rugby Field, Waterloo
Referee: Andrea Piardi (Italy)

== Top scorers ==
=== Top points scorers ===
Pos	Name	Team	Pts
1	David Weersma	Netherlands	34
2	Simon Perrod	Switzerland	23
3	Joshua Gascoigne	Netherlands	20
3	Jordy Hop	Netherlands	20
5	Jedrzej Nowicki	Poland	18

=== Top try scorers ===
Pos	Name	Team	Tries
1	Joshua Gascoigne	Netherlands	4
1	Jordy Hop	Netherlands	4
3	Felix Lammers	Germany	2
3	Eduard Vertyletskyi	Ukraine	2
5	23 players		1

== See also ==
- Rugby Europe International Championships
- 2019–20 Rugby Europe International Championships
- Six Nations Championship
- Antim Cup
