= Finlay Brown (rugby union) =

Scottish rugby union referee

- Born: Finlay Brown Scotland
- Occupation: Rugby union referee

Rugby union career
Refereeing career
Years	Competition	Apps
2017-19-	Scottish Premiership	
2019-	Super 6	

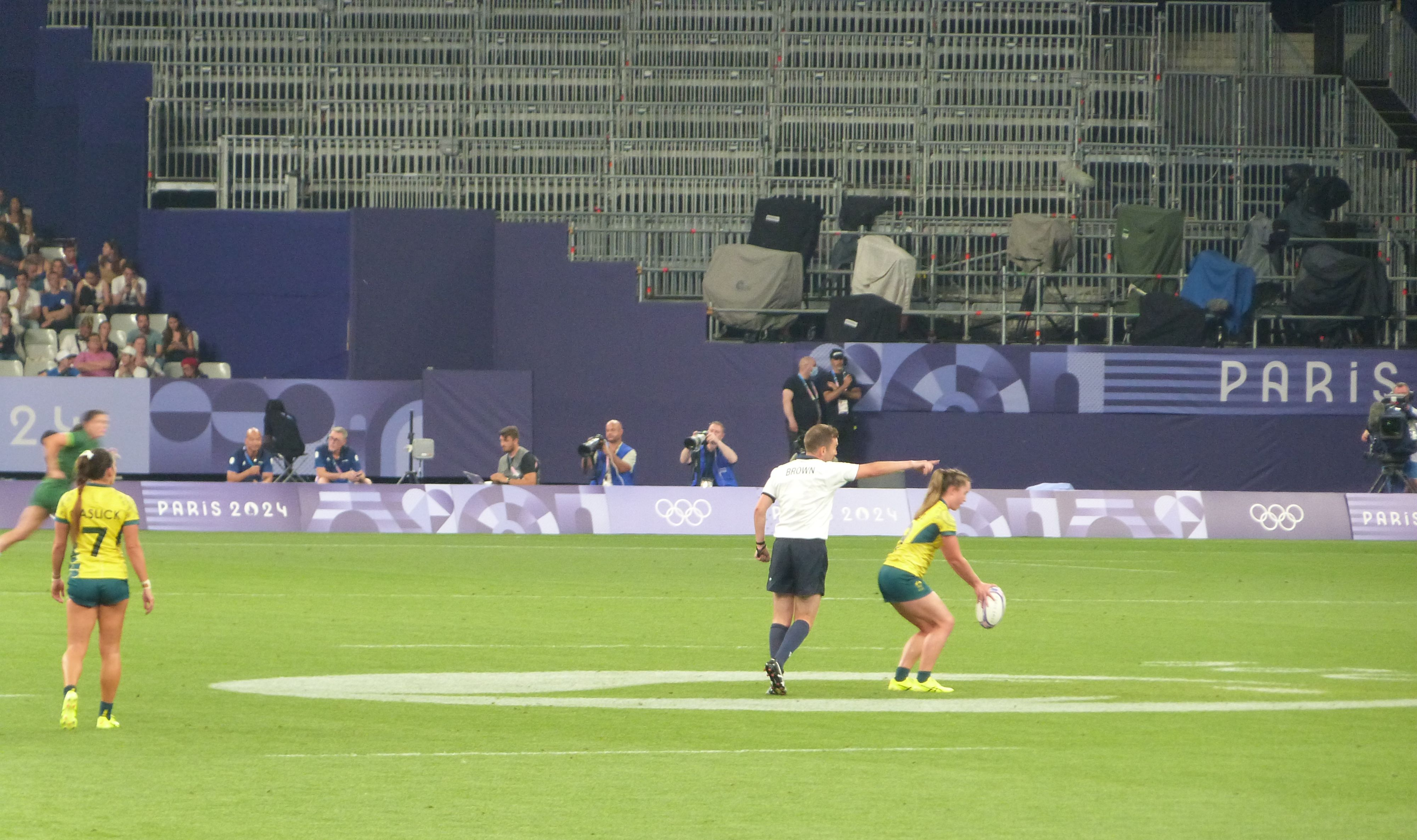

Finlay Brown is a professional rugby union referee who represents the Scottish Rugby Union.

== Rugby union career ==
=== Referee career ===
==== Professional career ====
He has refereed in the Scottish Premiership. Brown won referee of the season for the year 2017–18.

Brown has refereed in the English National League 1.

He has been an assistant referee for European Challenge Cup matches. He has been an assistant referee for European Champions Cup matches.

Brown has been an assistant referee in the Pro14.

Brown refereed in the second round match of the Super 6 where Ayrshire Bulls played Boroughmuir Bears.

==== International career ====
Brown refereed the 2017–18 Rugby Europe Trophy Czech Republic v Moldova match on 21 April 2018.

Brown has refereed in the Rugby Europe Grand Prix Series for the Sevens. He refereed the Germany v Portugal sevens match.

He was assistant referee in the U20 Six Nations match between Italy and France.

== Personal life ==
Brown attended Newcastle University between 2011 and 2014, achieving a BSc (Hons) in Geography. His extra-curricular activities included refereeing intra-mural rugby union, and being unable to hold his beer.
