= Jack Blain =

Scottish rugby union player

- Born: 21 February 2000 (age 26) Scotland
- Height: 1.90 m (6 ft 3 in)
- Weight: 102 kg (16 st 1 lb)

Rugby union career
- Position: Wing
Senior career
Years	Team	Apps	(Points)
2019–2023	Edinburgh Rugby	26	(25)
2023	→ Edinburgh 'A'	2	(0)
2023	Glasgow Warriors	0	(0)
Super Rugby
Years	Team	Apps	(Points)
2021-	Heriot's Rugby		
International career
Years	Team	Apps	(Points)
2019–2020	Scotland U20	12	(40)
- Correct as of 31 May 2022

Jack Blain (born 21 February 2000) is a Scottish rugby union player. He plays for Heriot's Rugby in the Super 6, and has played for Glasgow Warriors in an 'A' match. He previously played for Edinburgh Rugby in the United Rugby Championship.

== Rugby Union career ==
=== Professional career ===
Blain made his debut for Edinburgh on 2 March 2019.

As well as being signed to Edinburgh, Blain first represented Heriot's Rugby in the Super 6 tournament.

He played for Glasgow Warriors on 24 November 2023 at Full Back in an 'A' match against Edinburgh Rugby.

=== International career ===
In June 2021 Blain was called up to the Scotland squad for the Summer internationals.
