= Callum Templeton =

Scottish rugby union player

- Born: Callum Templeton; 31 August 1993 (age 33) Dumfries, Scotland
- Height: 6 ft 6 in (1.98 m)
- Weight: 104 kg (16 st 5 lb)
- School: Dumfries Academy

Rugby union career
- Position: Lock / Flanker / Number Eight
Amateur team(s)
Years	Team	Apps	(Points)
- Dumfries Saints
–	Ayr RFC		
International career
Years	Team	Apps	(Points)
- Scotland U17
–	Scotland U18		
–	Scotland Club XV		

Callum Templeton (born 31 August 1993 in Dumfries, Scotland) is a Scottish rugby union player who plays for Ayr RFC. He can play at Lock or Flanker or Number Eight.

Templeton has played for Scotland U17s, Scotland U18s and Scotland Club XV. He scored for Scotland Under 17s against England Under 17s in 2010. He was first called up to the Club international side in January 2014.

Reid first played for Dumfries Saints at youth level before playing for the first team.

He joined Ayr RFC at the start of season 2011-12. He was named RBS Player of the Season for 2013-14 with Ayr at the SRU Club awards.

He was named as part of Glasgow Warriors Elite Development Players for season 2012-13. He missed almost two seasons of rugby with injuries.
