= Bruce Houston =

Zimbabwe international rugby union player (born 1999)

- Born: 26 August 1999 (age 27) Ballymena, Northern Ireland
- Height: 1.93 m (6 ft 4 in)
- Weight: 92 kg (14.5 st; 203 lb)
- School: Ballymena Academy

Rugby union career
- Position: Fly-half
Amateur team(s)
Years	Team	Apps	(Points)
2018–2019	Ballymena		
Senior career
Years	Team	Apps	(Points)
2019–2021	Ulster	1	(0)
2021–2022	Heriot's Rugby Club	11	(48)
2022–2023	Edinburgh Rugby	0	(0)
2023	→ Edinburgh 'A'	3	(27)
2023–25	Cornish Pirates	46	(277)
2025–26	Union Sportive Bressane	16	(16)
2026–	Coventry	4	(65)
- Correct as of 9 October 2026
International career
Years	Team	Apps	(Points)
2017	Ireland U18		
2019	Ireland U20		
2025–	Zimbabwe	7	(11)
- Correct as of 21 November 2026

Bruce Houston (born 26 August 1999) is an Irish-born Zimbabwean international rugby union player who plays for Coventry in the English Championship.

Educated at Ballymena Academy, he played for Ireland at under-18 and under-20 level, including captaining the side at both levels. he joined the Ulster Rugby academy in 2018. He made one senior appearance for Ulster in January 2019, coming off the bench against Leinster in the 2018–19 Pro14. and played a number of times for Ulster 'A', including in the Celtic Cup, while also playing club rugby for Ballymena RFC. He joined Super 6 side Heriot's Rugby Club ahead of the 2021–22 season. He is Scottish-qualified, and signed for Edinburgh on a partnership deal in August 2022, but was released at the end of the 2022–23 season. He signed for the Cornish Pirates ahead of the 2023–24 season, making 46 appearances and scoring 277 points in his two seasons at the club. He joined Union Sportive Bressane at the end of the 2024-25 season.

On 11 July 2025, Houston was called up to Zimbabwe's squad for the 2025 Rugby Africa Cup in Uganda. Houston qualifies to play for Zimbabwe through his Zimbabwean-born mother. He was selected in Zimbabwe's replacements for both their semi-final against Kenya and final against Namibia, making his debut after coming off the bench in the second half of the latter match.
