= Caleb Korteweg =

New Zealand rugby union player

- Born: Caleb Korteweg; 1 January 1997 (age 29) New Zealand
- Height: 1.78 m (5 ft 10 in)
- Weight: 84 kg (13 st 3 lb)
- School: Hamilton Boys High School
- University: University of Waikato

Rugby union career
- Position: Scrum-half
Youth career
- 2002-20??: Melville RFC
- 20??: Chiefs
Senior career
Years	Team	Apps	(Points)
2016-2019	Waikato		
2019-	Stirling Wolves	31	(15)
2020–2021	Glasgow Warriors	1	(0)
International career
Years	Team	Apps	(Points)
2016-2017	New Zealand under-20		
2022	Netherlands	4	(0)
- Correct as of 31 March 2025

Caleb Korteweg is a New Zealand born rugby union player for Glasgow Warriors in the Pro14 and also plays for Netherlands rugby team in the Rugby Europe International Championships. Korteweg was part of the NZ u20 campaign in 2017 but after failing to make the final squad to compete at the 2017 junior World Cup he decided to move to Scotland and play professionally. Korteweg's primary position is scrum-half.

== Rugby Union career ==
=== Professional career ===
Korteweg originally moved to Scotland to represent Stirling County in the Super 6 in 2019.

He made his debut for Glasgow Warriors in Round 5 of the 2020–21 Pro14 against Ulster, when he was named as a late replacement on the bench following Jamie Dobie's withdrawal.

=== International career ===
He has played 4 times for the Netherlands.
