= Sam Kitchen =

Australian rugby union player

- Born: 6 April 1994 (age 32) Sydney, New South Wales, Australia
- Height: 1.80 m (5 ft 11 in)
- Weight: 107 kg (236 lb; 16 st 12 lb)

Rugby union career
- Position: Hooker
- Current team: Edinburgh
Senior career
Years	Team	Apps	(Points)
2015-	Northern Suburbs Rugby Club	135	(60)
2016-2017	Sydney Rays	2	(0)
2019-2020	Ayrshire Bulls	10	(40)
2020–2021	Edinburgh	2	(0)
- Correct as of 26 April 2021

Sam Kitchen (born 6 April 1994) is an Australian rugby union player for Edinburgh in the Pro14. Kitchen's primary position is hooker.

== Rugby union career ==
=== Professional career ===
Kitchen represented Sydney Rays before moving to Scotland to join Ayrshire Bulls. He joined Edinburgh in June 2020.
