= Keith Allen (rugby union) =

- Born: Keith Allen Northern Ireland
- University: University of Edinburgh
- Occupation: Rugby union referee

Rugby union career
Refereeing career
Years	Competition	Apps
2016-	Scottish Premiership	
2019-	Pro14	
2019-	Super 6	

Keith Allen is a professional rugby union referee who represents the Scottish Rugby Union.

== Rugby union career ==
=== Referee career ===
==== Professional career ====
He has refereed in the Scottish Premiership.

Allen now referees in the Pro14. His debut came in the Scarlets v Zebre match of 13 April 2019.

He is now part of the SRU Elite Referee Panel.

He has been Assistant Referee in the European Rugby Challenge Cup.

==== International career ====
Allen has refereed at international level. He took charge of the Rugby Europe match between Georgia and Germany on 10 March 2019.

He has also been Assistant Referee for the Portugal v Namibia match.

== Outside of rugby ==
Allen is a doctor for NHS Scotland.
