= Murray Buchan =

British freestyle skier

Personal information
- Nickname: Muzza
- Born: 2 December 1991 (age 34) Edinburgh, Scotland
- Height: 1.60 m (5 ft 3 in)
- Weight: 64 kg (141 lb)
- Website: www.murraybuchan.com

Sport
- Country: Great Britain
- Sport: Freestyle skiing
- Event: Halfpipe
- Club: GB Freeski team
- Coached by: Pat Sharples; Jamie Matthew

Murray Buchan (born 2 December 1991), nicknamed Muzza, is a freestyle skier who competes in the halfpipe. Buchan's Olympic debut was at the 2014 Winter Olympics in Sochi, where he competed on 18 February 2014 in the halfpipe, finishing in 17th place in the qualification round.

== Personal life ==
Buchan was born on 2 December 1991 in Edinburgh, Scotland. His father was a member of the Glenshee Ski Centre mountain rescue team.

== Career ==
Buchan began skiing at an Edinburgh dry skiing slope at age 8, encouraged by his parents; he wanted to follow his father and be part of a mountain rescue team. Buchan began to improve, progressing to local competitions, sponsored by ski shops. He began winning his age group at tournaments, and at the age of 14 performed at his first British Skiing Championships, at which he won four events in his age group. In 2008, he won his first British Skiing Championships in the halfpipe discipline, which led to his competing at World Cup skiing events, though mainly in Europe due to finances. He was forced out of the majority of the 2009 season after dislocating his elbow. At the start of January 2014, Buchan finished 13th, his best-ever result in a World Cup, at Calgary. In the winter, Buchan trains in Breckenridge, Colorado.

Buchan's Olympic debut was at the 2014 Winter Olympics in Sochi, which was the first time the halfpipe had been included in a Winter Olympics. Going into the games, Buchan was the British Olympic champion in the halfpipe. He competed in the qualifiers on 18 February 2014 in the freestyle skiing event halfpipe, and finished 17th, having targeted 18 or above in the run up to the games.
