= Ian Kenny (rugby union) =

Irish rugby union referee

- Born: Ian Kenny Ireland
- Occupation: Rugby union referee

Rugby union career
Refereeing career
Years	Competition	Apps
2014--	Scottish Premiership	
2019-	Super 6	

Ian Kenny is a professional rugby union referee who represents the Scottish Rugby Union. Born in Ireland, Kenny is based in Aberdeen, Scotland.

== Rugby union career ==
=== Referee career ===
==== Professional career ====
He has refereed in the Scottish Premiership.

In 2018-19 season he was placed in the Premier Panel of SRU referees, representing the Aberdeen Society.

Kenny has been an Assistant referee in the Pro14.

He has refereed the main Craven week match in South Africa.

==== International career ====
Kenny was the Assistant Referee in the France - Wales U20 Six Nations match in February 2019.

He was an Assistant Referee in the Rugby Europe trophy.

He was named as an official for the 2019 Rugby World Cup.
