= David Sutherland (rugby union) =

Scottish rugby union referee

- Born: David Sutherland Scotland
- University: Dundee University
- Occupation: Rugby union referee

Rugby union career
- Position: Fly-half
Amateur team(s)
Years	Team	Apps	(Points)
-	Hamilton		
–	Dundee HSFP		
–	Hamilton		
Refereeing career
Years	Competition		Apps
2015-	Scottish Premiership		
2019-	Super 6		

David Sutherland is a professional rugby union referee who represents the Scottish Rugby Union.

== Rugby union career ==
=== Playing career ===
==== Amateur career ====
Sutherland started at Hamilton.

Sutherland played for Dundee HSFP at Fly-half.

It was noted, by his peers, that he always had an inkling to be a rugby union referee: “He realised that not only was he the size of a malnourished Fintry teen, but he has absolutely no gas. He had the brain of a young Dan Carter, you see. The problem was that while he’d spot the gap in front of him, he’d have to hitchhike to get there, and if he bumped into anyone on the way he’d be broken in half. And then there was his place-kicking…”

After moving from Dundee, Sutherland again played for Hamilton.

=== Referee career ===
==== Professional career ====
He has refereed in the Scottish Premiership. He won referee of the season in 2017-18.

Sutherland refereed in the inaugural match of the Super 6 where Boroughmuir Bears played Stirling County.

He has been assistant referee in the European Rugby Champions Cup match between Ulster and Harlequins.

==== International career ====
Sutherland has refereed at international level. He took charge of the Rugby Europe U20 championship match Romania v Netherlands.

He was assistant referee in the Spain v Samoa match on 24 November 2018.

== Outside of rugby ==
Sutherland was a dental student at Dundee University. It was during this time at Dundee that he played for Dundee HSFP.
