= Ayr RFC =

Scottish rugby union club, based in Ayr

Coordinates: 55°25′35.79″N 4°38′5.92″W

(Scotland) Ayr
- Full name: Ayr Rugby Football Club
- Union: SRU
- Founded: 1897; 129 years ago
- Location: Ayr, Scotland
- Ground: Millbrae
- Coach: Grant Anderson
- League(s): Men: Scottish Premiership; Women: Scottish Women's West One
- 2025–26: Men: Scottish Premiership, 1st of 10 (champions); Women: Scottish Women's West One, 5th of 7
Team kit

Official website
- www.ayrrugbyclub.co.uk

Ayr Rugby Football Club is a rugby union club. The men's side play in the Scottish Premiership and the women's side play in the Scottish Women's West One. The team is based in Ayr in Scotland, and plays at Millbrae, Alloway.

Between the 2019-2020 and 2023–2024 seasons the club ran a men's professional side known as the Ayrshire Bulls which competed in the Super 6 league and Super Sprint competitions.

The Bulls were one of six franchises playing in the Super6 competition and had a 35-strong playing squad, which included loose-head prop Gordon Reid, who was in the Scotland squad at the 2019 Rugby World Cup. He had joined Ayr, his first club, from London Irish.

During that professional era, they also ran an amateur "Club XV" which competed in the Tennent's National League 1, a 2nd XV "Ayr-Millbrae", which plays in the SRU West Reserve League Division 1, and various age group teams, from age 4, up to age 18.

== Millbrae ==
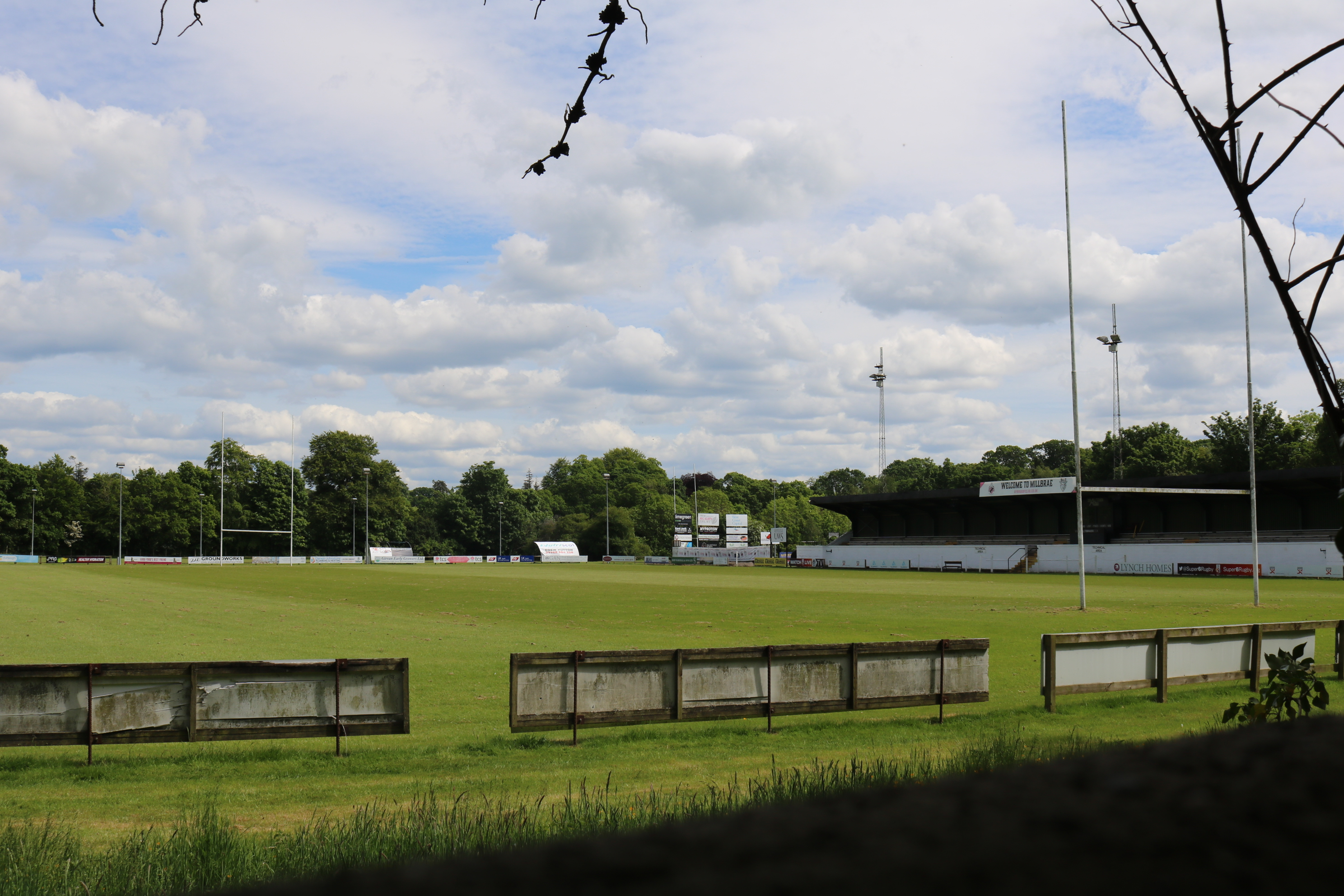
Millbrae in 2021

Millbrae is a rugby ground used by Ayr for both training and practice. It has two full-size rugby fields, one overlooked by a grandstand, and a clubhouse, which is used mainly for changing rooms, the function room, and the bar. Millbrae is adjacent to the Robert Burns Birthplace Museum and can be accessed either by a road from Alloway or via a small gate beside the museum.

Millbrae became Ayr's home in 1964, the club having moved from the original ground at Newton Park to Dam Park, then to the Old Racecourse and King George V playing field before finally taking up residence in Alloway. Newton Park is now the venue of international bowls competitions, Dam Park is an athletics stadium, and King George V is given over to soccer. Although its claim to fame came from the time a full Scottish trial was staged there in 1958, every other ground in Scotland being frost bound.

In March 2022, South Ayrshire council announced they had sold Dam Park stadium in central Ayr to the club.

== Caps and Representative honours ==
From its foundation in 1897, up until the 1960s, Ayr was a "junior" club, playing mainly in the Western Union. However, during the 1950s it gradually improved its fixture list in the old Unofficial Championship. Wartime "cap" Jock "Stiffy" McClure was a regular in Inter-City games, while Ayr regularly provided players to the combined Ayrshire-Renfrewshire side, which played Glasgow in trial games from which the Glasgow Inter-District squad was chosen.

Ayr had a particularly good record in the Glasgow & District Knock-Out Cup, going head-to-head with the leading Glasgow clubs. In 1960, Ayr winger Jim Black was decided for the Inter-City match, a rare honour for a player not with an Unofficial Championship club. Ayr were finally admitted to this competition in 1968. Throughout the 1960s, 1970s and 1980s, Ayr produced players of international standard. One who played and went on to be capped out of London Scottish was Alistair Boyle. Although supplying players to the Glasgow side (and Glasgow clubs) Ayr had to wait until 1977 for the first home-grown player to gain international honours. Winger David Ashton won his B cap against France, and in the following year John Brown was in the B side at full back in the same fixture. Earlier in that decade, loose-head prop Jock Craig had sat on the bench for the Scotland B side, and been chosen for the International Trial.

In 1980 Stephen Munro won the first of his ten full caps, against Ireland, the last coming in the Welsh match of the 1984 Grand Slam season. Probably Ayr's finest hour in representative terms came in December 1984. Five players – skipper Alan Brown returning from a serious knee injury, halfbacks George Nicolson and Grant Steel, and wing forwards David Brown and Colin McCallum – lined up for Glasgow against the touring Australians. The three Brown brothers certainly made an impact on rugby in Ayr. Alan skippered the team for several seasons, led the club on a Canadian Tour and carried on as coach/player. Chris McCallum, younger brother of Colin, was a member of the first Scotland Under-21 XV.

Other Ayr players who gained international caps at other clubs were Gordon Strachan, Quintin Dunlop, Derek Stark, Derrick Lee.

Strachan returned to Ayr in the late 1970s, when he captained the club. He went on to coach the team, leading them from the 3rd to 1st division.

Dunlop captained Ayr in the late seventies after his one cap with Scotland.

Derek Stark, Ayr's winger, gained B caps at Ayr, but the nine full caps came after he left the club as Ayr had been relegated to the 2nd Division. Stark later won caps with Boroughmuir RFC, Glasgow Hawks and Melrose RFC.

Derrick Lee played for Ayr from the ages of 8 to 18, gaining Scotland representation at all junior age groups. Unfortunately, university in Edinburgh meant he chose a local club (Watsonians) and he gained his 12 caps during the last ten years playing for London Scottish and Edinburgh.

Mark Bennett, now with Edinburgh, whose career began at nearby Cumnock, joined Ayr, aged 17 and played for the club prior to moving-on to the Glasgow Warriors and Scotland.

Scotland caps Ali Price and D'Arcy Rae also spent time with Ayr during their rise to international status.

Ross Curle, Robbie Fergusson (now co-captain of the Scotland Sevens squad), Stuart Fenwick, Danny McCluskey, Grant Anderson, Kerr Gossman, Stafford McDowall, Robbie Smith, Matt Davidson, Marshall Sykes, Euan McLaren and Paddy Dewhirst are just a few of the current and recent Ayr squad. They have represented Scotland at age grade level. Emily Irving of Ayr Ladies has caps for Scotland Women Under-20s and the senior side. Scott Sutherland, Craig Gossman, Dean Kelbrick, Andrew Dunlop, Nick Cox, Callum Templeton, Robin McAlpine, Steven Longwell, Blair Macpherson, Pete McCallum, David Armstrong, Damien Kelly have all played for the Scotland Club XV. Gordon Reid, Pat MacArthur and Finn Russell won full international caps in the 2013–14 season.

== 2008–09 Season – Premier 1 Champions ==
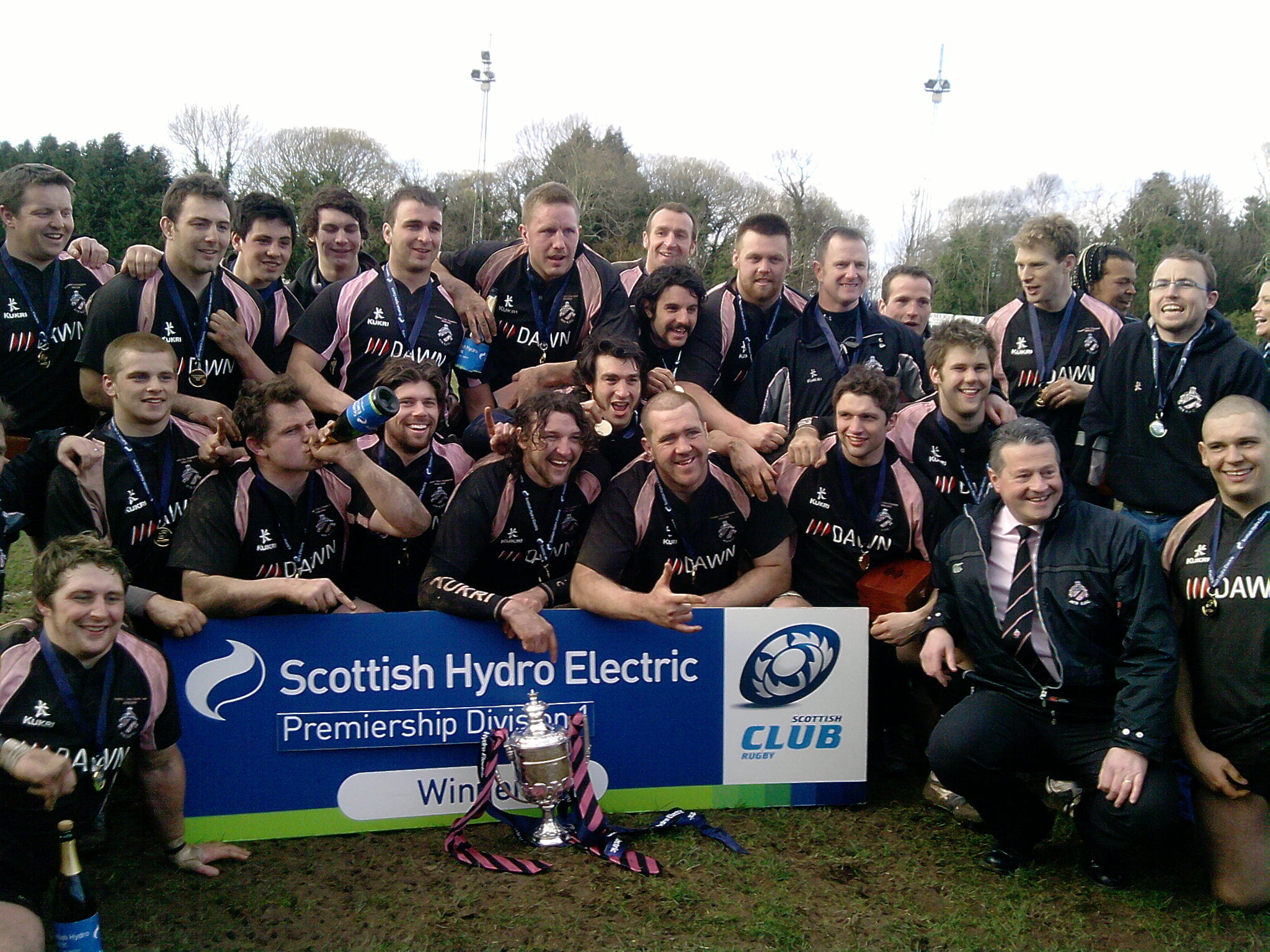
Ayr players celebrating the Premier League Trophy won in 2009

On 7 March 2009, the 1st XV made history as the first Ayr team to win the Premier Division, after a 20–10 win against Edinburgh Accies with 3 games still left in the season.

== 2009–10 and 2010–11 Seasons – Scottish Cup Success ==
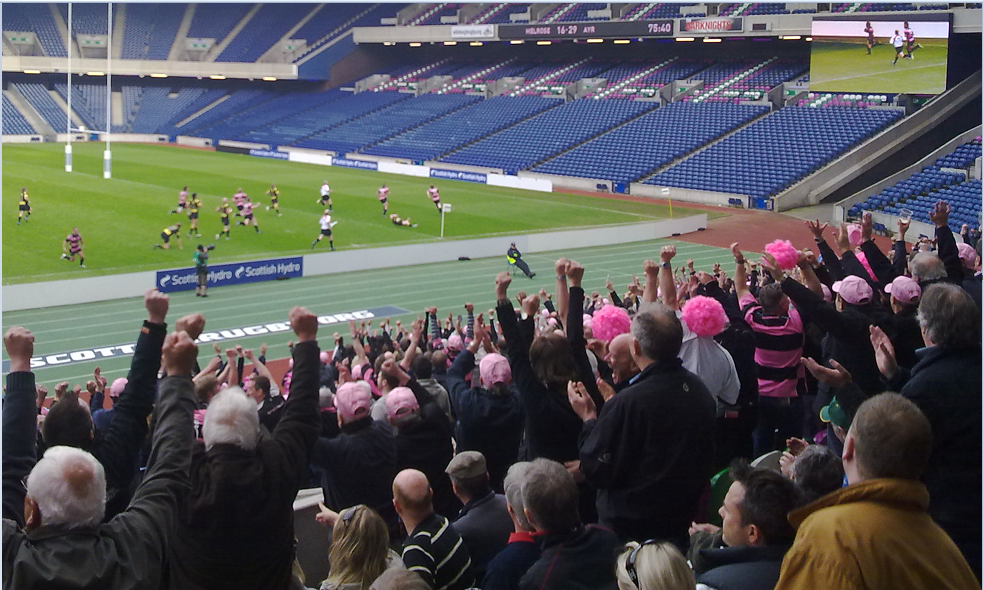
Andy Wilson scoring Ayr's fifth and final try in 2010

On 24 April 2010, Ayr ran overpowered Melrose 36–23 to win the Scottish Cup final at Murrayfield. Following a late burst of scoring meant they finished the game with five tries – enough for the bonus point they wanted in a match that also counted towards the Scottish Premiership race, however the next match was the decider at Currie RFC, in front of 2,500 people, where Ayr were beaten narrowly missing out on an unprecedented double.

Ayr retained their cup title on 16 April 2011 by again beating Melrose, this time by 25–21.

Ayr went on to Murrayfield for a third consecutive final in 2012, but this time were defeated by Gala.

== 2012–13 Further Success ==
The 2012–13 season proved very fruitful for Ayr. Their first silverware came in November through the Bill McLaren Shield, a new trophy for winning at home, taking possession of the shield when they beat Edinburgh Accies at Raeburn Place, and then becoming the first team to have their name engraved on it, having defended it four times after beating GHA in a West Regional Shield tie. Ayr were still in possession of the trophy at the end of the season having not been beaten at home in any competition all year. Ayr continued their success by winning the RBS West Cup with a 15–10 victory over Glasgow Hawks.

On 23 February 2013, with one game remaining, a 39–13 victory over Currie, the reverse fixture being the only defeat for Ayr in the league, coupled with the only challengers Gala Rugby losing, meant the Scottish Premiership returned to Millbrae. On 21 April 2013, Ayr won the Scottish Cup for the third time, beating Melrose 28–25 thanks to a Cammy Taylor try in extra time. 2012–13 was capped with Ayr named Club of the Season at the SRU Awards at Murrayfield.

In season 2018-19 Ayr won both the Tennent's Premiership Grand Final, and one week later the Scottish Cup Final, beating Heriot's in both matches. In the Cup Final, at Murrayfield, long-serving Kiwi stand-off Frazier Climo kicked the match-winning penalty, from the touchline, in time added on for injuries. This was the final match for the Ayr First XV. In the new season, most of the first team squad moved across to Ayrshire Bulls, to play in the FOSROC Super6, with the 'Club XV' being placed, along with the other five Super6 "Club XVs" in National League 1.

== British and Irish Cup ==
Ayr took part in the British and Irish Cup competition from its introduction in the 2009–10 season until the 2011–12 season. In the first year of the competition, Ayr finished 4th in group D having lost to Doncaster (A), Cardiff (A), Pontypridd (H) and beating Rotherham (H) and Birmingham and Solihull (H).

In the second year of the competition, Ayr were pooled with the same teams in group D again (apart from the replacement of Cardiff by Llandovery) with the location of the fixtures being reversed. Ayr finished second in the group, losing to Pontypridd (A), drawing with Rotherham (A) and beating Birmingham and Solihull (A), Llandovery (H) and Doncaster (H).

As a result of finishing second Ayr earned a quarter-final place, the first and only Scottish team to do so. Ayr were drawn away to Bristol where they lost 29–19.

In the 2011–12 season, Ayr played Munster and Plymouth away with Cross Keys and Bristol visiting Millbrae.

After failing to qualify in 2012–13, B&I Cup rugby returned to Millbrae in 2013–14 season after Ayr secured the 2013 Scottish Premiership. They were the only Scottish side to record any wins, with victories over Ulster Ravens and Jersey. They did not compete in the Cup in 2014–15 after the SRU withdrew the Scottish clubs due to money.

== Ayr Sevens ==
The club run the Ayr Sevens tournament.

== Honours ==
=== Ayrshire Bulls ===
- Super 6
  - Champions: 2021-22

=== Men ===
- Scottish Premiership
  - Champions (6): 2008–09, 2012–13, 2016–17, 2018–19, 2024-25, 2025-26
  - Runners-Up: (2) 2015–16, 2017–18
- Scottish Cup
  - Champions: (5) 2009–10, 2010–11, 2012–13, 2018–19, 2025-26
  - Runners-Up: (2) 2011–12, 2016–17
- Ayr Sevens
  - Champions: 1938, 1964, 1981, 1986, 1988, 1990, 1991, 1992, 1993
- Hillhead HSFP Sevens
  - Champions: 1986, 1988
- Glasgow University Sevens
  - Champions: 1986
- Cumnock Sevens
  - Champions: 1983, 1987
- Wigtownshire Sevens
  - Champions: 1977, 1978
- Greenock Sevens
  - Champions: 1979, 1988, 1989, 1990, 2000

== Current squad ==
Information based on the club's website and team sheets published by The Offside Line

The Ayr squad for the 2026–27 Scottish Premiership season
**Props**: (Scotland) Jamie Drummond^{CXV}; (Scotland) Calvin Henderson; (Scotland) Rhod Tanner; (Scotland) Caleb Rae; (Scotland) Jake Paton; (Scotland) Ruaraidh Sayce; (Scotland) Nimmo; **Hookers**: (Scotland) Alex McGuire; (Scotland) Jamie McAughtrie; (Scotland) Seth Rae; (Scotland) Joe Roberts^{GW}; **Locks**: (Scotland) Ed Bloodworth (c); (Scotland) Rory Jackson; (Scotland) Jack Haynes; (Scotland) Oscar Baird^{CXV}; (Scotland) Cameron Reece	**Back row**: (Scotland) Tim Brown^{CXV}; (Scotland) Ryan Sweeney; (Scotland) Hamish Cornell; **Scrum-halves**: (Scotland) Fergus Johnston; (Scotland) Cameron McGarey; (Scotland) Adam McGowan; **Fly-halves**: (Scotland) Bobby Beattie^{CXV}; (Scotland) Liam Brims	**Centres**: (Scotland) Jamie Shedden^{CXV}; (Scotland) Robbie Orr; (Scotland) Andy Stirrat; **Wings**: (Scotland) Jack Craig; (South Africa) Cameron Van Wyk^{*}^{GW}; (Scotland) Lewis McNamara; **Fullbacks**: (Scotland) Chris Hyde; (Scotland) Scott Watson; (Scotland) Ryan Hind
(c) denotes the team captain, **Bold** denotes internationally capped players.^{*} denotes players qualified to play for Scotland on residency or dual nationality. ^{CXV} denotes Scotland Club XV capped players. ^{GW} denotes Glasgow Warriors academy players allocated to the club.

== Notable former players ==
=== Men ===
==== Scotland internationalists ====
The following former Ayr players have represented Scotland at full international level.

- (Scotland) Alasdair Boyle
- (Scotland) Derrick Lee
- (Scotland) Sam Pinder
- (Scotland) Gordon Strachan
- (Scotland) Gordon Reid
- (Scotland) Steve Munro
- (Scotland) Derek Stark
- (Scotland) Pat MacArthur
- (Scotland) Ryan Grant
- (Scotland) Quintin Dunlop
- (Scotland) Finn Russell
- (Scotland) Mark Bennett

==== Glasgow District ====
The following former Ayr players have represented Glasgow District at provincial level.

- (Scotland) Alan Brown
- (Scotland) Colin McCallum
- (Scotland) Kirk Murdoch
- (Scotland) George Nicolson
- (Scotland) D.H. Kennedy
- (Scotland) John Burston
- (Scotland) Grant Steel
- (Scotland) Jim Black
- (Scotland) Jock Craig
- (Scotland) David Brown
- (Scotland) Jim Ramage
- (Scotland) John F Brown
- (Scotland) Fergus McDowall

==== Glasgow Warriors ====
The following former Ayr players have represented Glasgow Warriors at provincial level.

- (Scotland) Robbie Fergusson
- (Zimbabwe) Denford Mutamangira
- (Scotland) James Malcolm
- (Scotland) Alasdhair McFarlane
- (Scotland) Stafford McDowall
- (Scotland) D'Arcy Rae
- (Scotland) Will Bordill
- (Scotland) Fergus Scott
- (Scotland) Steven Manning
- (Scotland) Callum Templeton
- (Scotland) Andrew Kelly
- (Scotland) David Jamieson
- (Fiji) Jerry Yanuyanutawa
- (Scotland) Peter Jericevich
- (Wales) Javan Sebastian
- (New Zealand) Eddie McLaughlin
- (Scotland) Ryan Grant

==== Others ====
- Former England cricket captain Mike Denness also played rugby for Ayr.
- (Scotland) Jock "Stiffy" McClure won eight war-time and one Victory Cap during World War II, while playing with Ayr, but, never won a full cap. "Stiffy" played for Ayr from the 1930s through to the 1970s, and was also Head of PE at Cumnock Academy, then Ayr Academy, in which roles, he sent many players to play for the club.
