= Meggetland Sports Complex =

Sports venue in City of Edinburgh, Scotland

- Meggetland
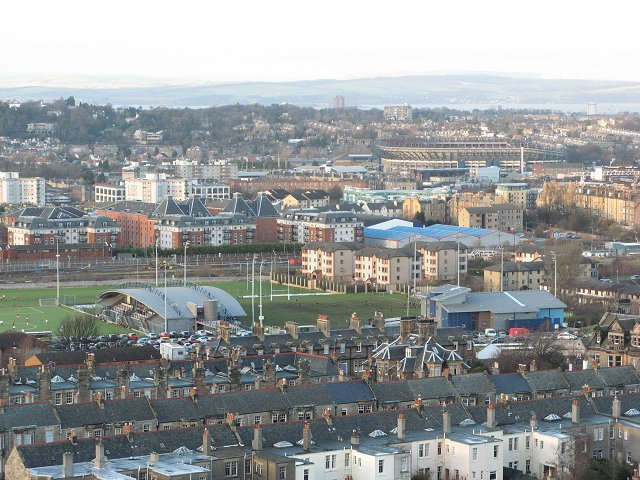
- Meggetland in 2006

- Location within the City of Edinburgh council area
- Location: Craiglockhart, Edinburgh, Scotland
- Coordinates: 55°55′41″N 3°14′04″W
- Operator: Edinburgh Leisure
- Capacity: 4,388 (500 seats)
- Surface: Grass
- Public transit: Slateford

Construction
- Opened: Redeveloped in 2006

Tenants
- Boroughmuir RFC; Boroughmuir Hockey Club; Edinburgh Cala Hockey Club; Boroughmuir Thistle F.C. Boroughmuir Cricket Club; Edinburgh Wolves; Tynecastle F.C. (2018–present)

Meggetland is a multi-purpose sports pavilion in Edinburgh, Scotland. The complex consists of multiple astroturf and grass pitches for football, rugby, hockey, and cricket, regularly hosting these sports. Notably, the ground hosted three Edinburgh Rugby matches during the 2013–14 Pro 12 season against Ospreys, Cardiff Blues and Munster.

In January 2016, the Edinburgh Wolves announced that due to the closure of Meadowbank Stadium for redevelopment, they would be moving to play their home games for the 2016 season at Meggetland.

East of Scotland Football League team Tynecastle F.C. moved to Meggetland from their previous Saughton Enclosure ground in 2018 and will share the main stadium grass pitch with Boroughmuir.
