= Greenyards =

Sports ground in Melrose, Scotland

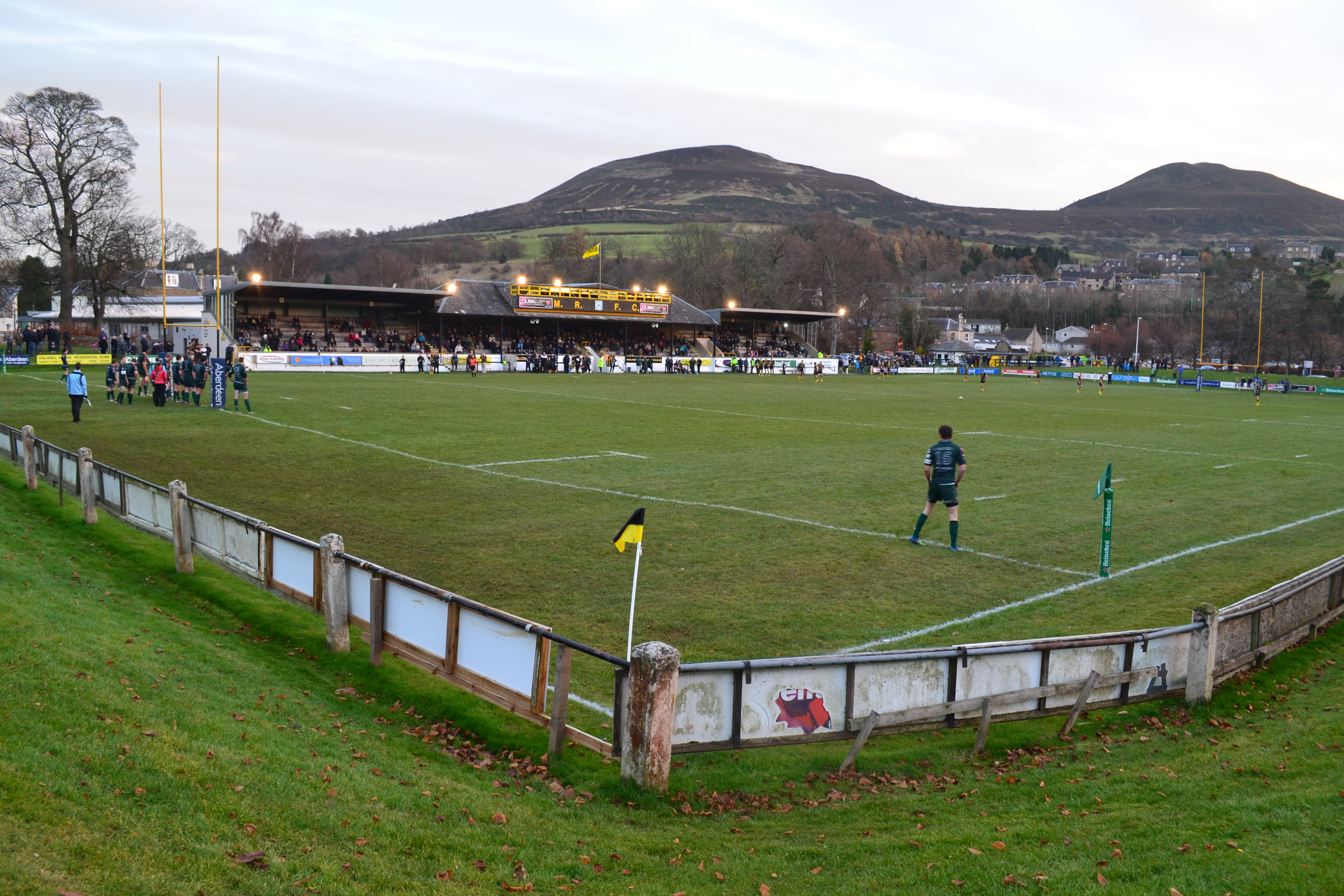
- The Greenyards in 2013
- Interactive map of Greenyards
- Location: High Street; Melrose; Roxburghshire; Scotland; TD6 9SA
- Coordinates: 55.6000°N 2.7230°W
- Owner: Ormiston Trust
- Capacity: 1,174
- Surface: 3G pitch

Tenant
- Melrose RFC

The Greenyards is a sports ground in Melrose, Scottish Borders. It has been the home of Melrose RFC for rugby union matches and the annual Melrose Sevens tournament. The first ever rugby 7s matches were played at the ground in 1883. The professional side Southern Knights use it for home matches in the Super 6 competition. In 2019 the grass pitches were replaced with an artificial surface, with floodlights around the ground. The ground has a capacity of 15,000.

== History ==
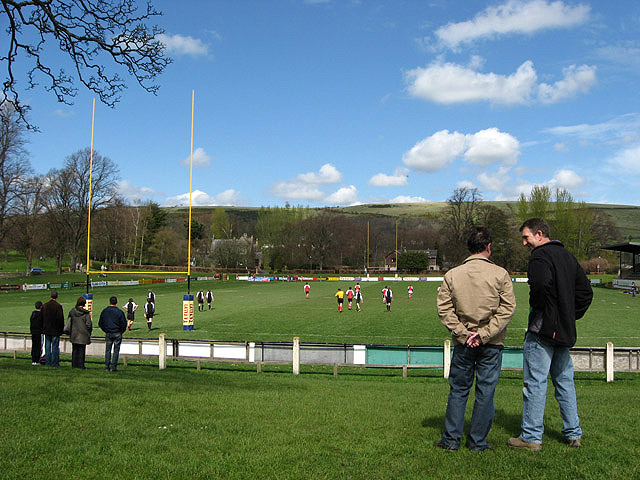
An under 15s seven a side tournament in 2008

The press box dates from the 1930s. The main stand on the east side of the playing area has 1174 seats. More than 10,000 people were expected at the 2012 Melrose Sevens tournament.

In late August 2016, plans were put forward for redevelopment. These plans included increasing the pitch size and improve lighting to be strong enough to cater for television coverage.

In 2019 the main stand was renamed the Cairnhill Steel Solutions Stand, as part of a sponsorship deal.

The installation of the 3G pitches received support from Scottish Borders Council and Scottish Rugby. The official opening of the new 3G pitch with floodlights took place in November 2019.

A plaque on the side of the stand in memory of Ned Haig was officially unveiled in April 2022.
