= Scottish Premiership (rugby union) =

Amateur league competition for Scottish rugby union clubs

Scottish Men's Premiership
- Sport: Rugby union
- Founded: 1973
- No. of teams: 10
- Country: Scotland
- Most recent champion: Ayr (6th title)
- Most titles: Hawick (13 titles)
- Broadcasters: BBC Alba; Scottish Rugby Youtube
- Sponsor: Arnold Clark
- Level on pyramid: 1
- Relegation to: National League Division One
- Domestic cup: Scottish Cup
- Website: https://scottishrugby.org

The Scottish Premiership (known as the Arnold Clark Men's Premiership for sponsorship reasons) is the highest level of league competition for men's amateur rugby union clubs in Scotland. First held in 1973, it is the top division of the Scottish League Championship. The most recent champions are Ayr, while the most successful club is Hawick who have won the competition thirteen times.

Ten clubs contest the league, with the bottom club relegated to the Scottish National League Division One.

The top level of club rugby in Scotland are the two professional teams – Edinburgh Rugby and Glasgow Warriors – that play in the United Rugby Championship. They assign their players to the clubs below in a pro draft so that they can still play when not used by the professional sides.

== History ==
Up to season 1972–73, Scotland's rugby union clubs participated in what was known as the Scottish Unofficial Championship. It provided very unbalanced competition: some clubs played more fixtures than others and some fixture lists provided stiffer opposition than others. The resulting league table at the end of each season gave a very unbalanced and difficult-to-comprehend set of results.

Starting in season 1973–74, the Scottish Rugby Union organised the full member clubs into six leagues. This suited some of the 'open' clubs, but many of the older former pupils' clubs found it difficult to compete successfully, and were forced into going 'open' themselves to try to recruit some of the better players. Those who didn't declined. Open clubs kept their old FP or academic name, and still played on grounds owned by the schools. In the first 14 seasons of league rugby, the Division I championship was won by Hawick on ten occasions.

One consequence was soon apparent: fewer players were selected from English clubs to represent Scotland. For the first time since before the First World War, the domestic game was producing an adequate number of players of genuine international class. Though the SRU's administrators were often seen as backward-looking, Scotland had a national league before England, Wales, or Ireland.

Heriot's FP became the first city club to win the championship. They had already attracted "outsiders"; their leading try-scorer was Bill Gammell, a Fettesian already capped for the Scotland national rugby union team while playing for Edinburgh Wanderers. League rugby drew the crowds, and the 20 years that followed its introduction were the best in the history of Scottish club rugby. During that period the title of champions rarely left the Borders, with Hawick, Melrose and Gala enjoying long periods of ascendancy. Latterly, however, Borders' domination has weakened with teams from across the central belt featuring, particularly from Edinburgh, with Boroughmuir, Watsonians and Currie, along with Heriot's, all champions.

Since the advent of the leagues, the Scottish Rugby Union and its member clubs have reorganised the competition several times, usually to change the number of teams. The top Scottish clubs qualified to the British and Irish Cup from 2009 to 2014. Then from season 2019–20, a semi-professional championship in Scotland, known as the Super 6, was introduced – its teams no longer took part in the Premiership competition; however, this was changed when the Super 6 was discontinued after the 2023/24 season. The Super 6 format was intended to bridge the gap between the amateur grade and the professional United Rugby Championship teams.

A new set of dominant clubs arose after the members of the Super 6 broke off from the premiership. Currie Chieftains, Marr and a rejuvenated Hawick team became regular finishers in the playoff spots on the table from between the 2019/20 season and the present one (2023/24). All three sides won a title each during that time period.

Although the Super 6 was above the Premiership in the national hierarchy and its clubs were selected directly from the existing members, from 2021 until the final season, its format was a 'closed shop' with no movement of teams between the Super 6 and the Premiership.

The 50th anniversary season of the competition was won by the Currie Chieftains, who recorded a 26-24 victory away to Hawick in May 2024, winning their third premiership title as a result.

== Competition format ==
Each of the 10 clubs play each other at home and away between August and January, resulting in 18 games played by each club. Four points are awarded for a win, two for a draw and zero for a loss. Bonus points are also on offer in each game – one for scoring four or more tries and the other for the losing club finishing within seven points of the winning club.

=== Play-off ===
From season 2014–15 an end of season play-off was introduced for the top four clubs in the table. These clubs take part in a knock-out competition, with first playing third and second playing fourth in a semi-final match at the home venue of the highest finishing clubs. The winners then face each other in the final to determine the Premiership champion.

=== Relegation ===
The bottom club is relegated and replaced by the winners of National League Division 1, while 9th place compete in a play-off match with 2nd in National League Division 1.

== 2026–27 Teams ==
Location of teams in 2026–27 Scottish Premiership

Departing were Selkirk, relegated to National League Division One.

Joining were Edinburgh Accies, promoted as champions from National League Division One.

Team	Ground	Location	Capacity	Surface	Floodlit	2025–26
Ayr	Millbrae	Ayr		Grass		Champions
Currie Chieftains	Malleny Park	Edinburgh	2,000	Grass		Runners-up
Edinburgh Academical	Raeburn Place	Edinburgh		Grass	Yes	Promoted (1st)
Glasgow Hawks	Balgray	Glasgow	3,000	Grass	No	9th
GHA	Braidholm	Glasgow		Grass	No	6th
Hawick	Mansfield Park	Hawick	5,000	Grass	Yes	7th
Heriot's	Goldenacre	Edinburgh	3,000	Grass	No	3rd
Kelso	Poynder Park	Kelso	3,000	Grass		5th
Melrose	Greenyards	Melrose		Artificial	Yes	8th
Watsonian	Myreside	Edinburgh	5,500	Grass	Yes	4th

== Past winners ==
1974. Hawick
1975. Hawick (2)
1976. Hawick (3)
1977. Hawick (4)
1978. Hawick (5)
1979. Heriot's
1980. Gala
1981. Gala (2)
1982. Hawick (6)
1983. Gala (3)
1984. Hawick (7)
1985. Hawick (8)
1986. Hawick (9)
1987. Hawick (10)
1988. Kelso
1989. Kelso (2)
1990. Melrose
1991. Boroughmuir
1992. Melrose (2)
1993. Melrose (3)
1994. Melrose (4)
1995. Stirling County
1996. Melrose (5)
1997. Melrose (6)
1998. Watsonians
1999. Heriot's (2)
2000. Heriot's (3)
2001. Hawick (11)
2002. Hawick (12)
2003. Boroughmuir (2)
2004. Glasgow Hawks
2005. Glasgow Hawks (2)
2006. Glasgow Hawks (3)
2007. Currie
2008. Boroughmuir (3)
2009. Ayr
2010. Currie (2)
2011. Melrose (7)
2012. Melrose (8)
2013. Ayr (2)
2014. Melrose (9)
2015. Heriot's (4)
2016. Heriot's (5)
2017. Ayr (3)
2018. Melrose (10)
2019. Ayr (4)
2020. Null and void
2021. No competition
2022. Marr
2023. Hawick (13)
2024. Currie Chieftains
2025. Ayr (5)
2026. Ayr (6)
