= Myreside Stadium =

Sports ground in Edinburgh, Scotland

Myreside
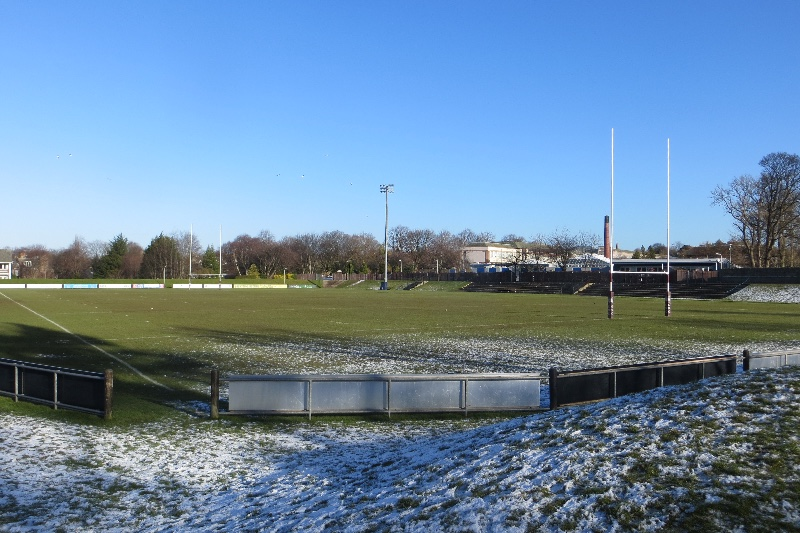
- Interactive map of Myreside
- Location: 82 Myreside Road; Edinburgh; EH10 5BZ
- Coordinates: 55.9278°N 3.2235°W
- Owner: George Watson's College
- Capacity: 13,799
- Surface: Grass
- Public transit: Slateford railway station

Construction
- Opened: 1933

Tenants
- Watsonians (1933–) Edinburgh Reivers (1999–2002)

Myreside Stadium is a sports ground in Edinburgh, Scotland. Often simply known as Myreside, Watsonians RFC have used this venue on the east side of Myreside Road as their home ground for rugby union matches since 1933. Edinburgh Rugby used it for some home matches 1996–2002 and again in 2017 and 2018; this included Pro14 and European Rugby Challenge Cup matches. A main stand is positioned along the west side of the grass pitch, with floodlights around the ground. Ahead of the Edinburgh Rugby team's return to play home matches at the stadium, temporary stands were installed to increase seating capacity to 13,799.

== History ==
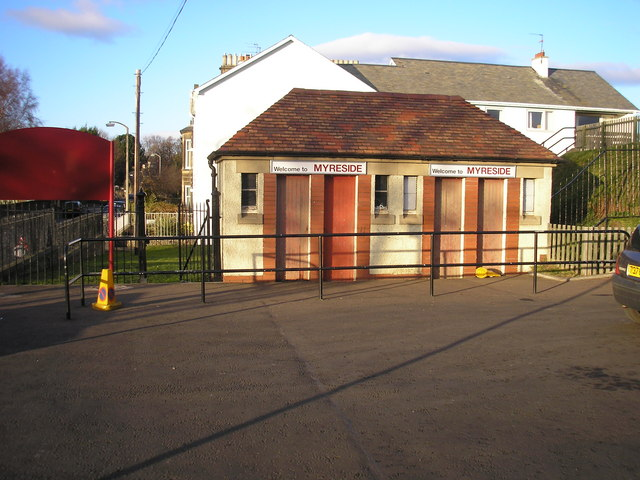
One of the Myreside turnstile gates in 2007

The ground originally used by Watsonians RFC was called Myreside, which took its name from a local farm. On 4 March 1933, Watsonians played their first match at New Myreside, against Royal High School FP Rugby Club. A West stand was constructed. The Watsonian Cricket Club play at the adjacent Myreside Cricket Ground.

When rugby turned professional, Edinburgh Rugby used the stadium for their home matches 1996 to 1998. That team was succeeded by the Edinburgh Reivers which played at Myreside from 1999–2002.

In May 2016, Edinburgh Rugby announced a partnership with the owners of the ground, George Watson's College. The partnership allowed a trial period starting in January 2017 for Edinburgh to return to Myreside for six months, downsizing from Murrayfield Stadium. The pitch has floodlights but the facilities at the ground are ageing. The plans involved increasing the stadium capacity by erecting temporary stands at the North and South ends. Edinburgh City Council approved plans to erect temporary stands in December 2016. The temporary stands were erected as close as possible to the dead-ball lines. The capacity was increased to just above 13,799 seats in time for Edinburgh to play their first game in January 2017.

In July 2017, Edinburgh set out plans that involved playing a minimum of nine home matches at Myreside for the next three seasons, subject to planning permission. Some of their fixtures, including the annual 1872 Cup clash, would be played at Murrayfield.

In February 2018 Edinburgh announced that the remainder of the season's matches would be played at Murrayfield. Within a couple of weeks, the club had confirmed that Myreside would no longer be used as their home venue.

== Transport ==
The ground is near several routes operated by Lothian Buses.

Myreside is a 2-minute cycle from the Canal National Cycle Route 754 which runs through the West of the city.
