= Boroughmuir RFC =

Scottish rugby union club, based in Edinburgh

Boroughmuir
- Full name: Boroughmuir Rugby & Community Sports Club
- Union: SRU
- Founded: 1919; 107 years ago
- Location: Edinburgh, Scotland
- Ground: Meggetland (Capacity: 4,000)
- President: Stevie Douglas
- Coach(es): Head Coach: Graham Shiel; Backs: Davy Wilson; Forwards: Alex Toolis
- League: Scottish National League Division One
- 2025–26: Scottish National League Division One, 6th of 10
Team kit

Official website
- boroughmuirrugby.co.uk

Boroughmuir RFC is a rugby union club in the Scottish Rugby Union. The club's home ground is Meggetland, in southwest Edinburgh and the club plays in the Scottish National League Division One. Between the 2019-2020 and 2023-2024 seasons the club ran a men's professional side known as the Boroughmuir Bears which competed in the Super 6 league and Super Sprint competitions.

Founded in 1919 and admitted to the SRU in 1939, it was originally restricted to former pupils of Boroughmuir High School. The badge is derived from Boroughmuir High School and they acquired it in 1913. Although it has lost that direct connection, the home ground and navy blue/emerald colours are unchanged.

The club won the Scottish unofficial club rugby championship in the 1954–55 and 1972–73 seasons. The club have the second longest number of seasons in the top division having only been relegated twice and on both occasions bouncing straight back up to the top division. The record is held by Heriots FP who have never been relegated. Boroughmuir became the first team to win the Scottish Cup "back to back" in 2001, and the first team to win it three times in 2015.

The club were awarded one of the semi pro Super Six franchises to commence season 2019/20. Former Scotland International Graham Shiel has been appointed head coach of the Super Six Squad

The club's ground (Meggetland) has recently undergone major development to turn it into one of the premier facilities in Scottish rugby. A new stand and clubhouse were built, along with new pitches for the 2nd and 3rd XV, an international standard all-weather hockey pitch and five-a-side football pitches.

== Sevens ==
The club run the Boroughmuir / Capital Sevens tournament.

== Honours ==
- Scottish Premiership
  - Champions (3): 1990–91, 2002–03, 2007–08
- Scottish National League Division One
  - Champions (2): 1999–00, 2013–14
- Scottish Cup
  - Champions (4): 1999–00, 2000–01, 2004–05, 2014-15
  - Runners-Up (1): 1996-97
- Capital Sevens
  - Champions (2): 2010, 2012
- Glasgow City Sevens
  - Champions (1): 2003
- Melrose Sevens
  - Champions (2): 1963, 2002
- Kelso Sevens
  - Champions (1): 1977
- Langholm Sevens
  - Champions (2): 1975, 1978
- Hawick Sevens
  - Champions (3): 1978, 1987, 2019
- Gala Sevens
  - Champions (1): 2006
- Peebles Sevens
  - Champions (5): 1959, 1969, 1980, 2003, 2006
- Selkirk Sevens
  - Champions (1): 2019
- Walkerburn Sevens
  - Champions (3): 1931, 1933, 1949
- North Berwick Sevens
  - Champions (1): 2021
- Edinburgh Charity Sevens
  - Champions (1): 1970
- Royal HSFP Sevens
  - Champions (5): 1973, 1974, 1976, 1980, 1983
- Portobello Sevens
  - Champions (2): 1986, 1987
- Caithness Sevens
  - Champions (2): 1995, 1998
- Forrester Sevens
  - Champions (2): 1988, 1989
- Alloa Sevens
  - Champions (1): 1984
- Lismore Sevens
  - Champions (9): 1974, 1980, 1981, 1992, 1993, 1994, 1995, 1996, 2001
- Penicuik Sevens
  - Champions (3): 1994, 1995, 1998
- Holy Cross Sevens
  - Champions (1): 1998
- Haddington Sevens
  - Champions (6): 1976, 1980, 1981, 1994, 2008, 2019
- Glasgow Academicals Sevens
  - Champions (1): 1970
- Kilmarnock Sevens
  - Champions (5): 1961, 1969, 1970, 1976, 1977
- Musselburgh Sevens
  - Champions (4): 1961, 1969, 1970, 1972
- Kirkcaldy Sevens
  - Champions (4): 1951, 1952, 1953, 1955
- Howe of Fife Sevens
  - Champions (1): 1987
- Stirling Sevens
  - Champions (2): 1951, 2011
- Currie Sevens
  - Champions (3): 1983, 1989, 1996
- Edinburgh Northern Sevens
  - Champions (1): 2011

== Notable players ==
Famous Boroughmuir players with international rugby honours:

- (Scotland) Ken Ross, the first capped Boroughmuir player, 10 Scottish caps 1961–63
- Sean Lineen, Scotland International the original kilted Kiwi and former Boroughmuir coach. Current Scotland Under 20 Coach
- Iain Paxton, British Lions Scotland & Barbarians forward and former Boroughmuir, Edinburgh & Scotland U-21 coach
- Derek Stark, Scotland winger
- Mike Blair, British Lions and Scotland scrum half
- Chris Cusiter, British Lions and Scotland scrum half
- Tom Palmer, England lock
- Peter Wright, British Lions and Scotland prop former 1st XV head coach & BBC Radio Scotland rugby pundit
- Bruce Hay, British Lions, Scotland & Barbarians Full Back & Wing, former head coach and director of rugby
- Alasdair Strokosch, Scotland flanker
- Norrie Rowan, Scotland & Barbarians Prop member of 1984 Grand Slam squad
- Bill Watson, Scotland & Barbarians No 8, Former SRU Chief Executive and Current Boroughmuir Vice Chairman
- Stuart Reid, Scotland No 8 and former forwards coach also played at Leeds & Narbonne
- Dave Callam, Scotland No 8 and flanker
- Graham Hogg, Scotland Centre and former coach
- Graeme Beveridge, Scotland Scrum Half
- Chris Tregaskis, New Zealand Second Row
- Damien Hoyland, Scotland International & Scotland 7's
- (Netherlands) Sep Visser, Wing, Dutch International, brother of Scotland International Tim Visser
- Andy Rose, Zimbabwe International and Captain, Scotland Club International
- Magnus Bradbury, Scotland International & Scotland 7's
- Jake Kerr, Scotland International

Famous former players associated with Boroughmuir RFC:-

- Murray Buchan, Scrum Half & Team GB Olympic Half Pipe Skier 2014 & 2018 Winter Games
- Ben Fisher, Former Scotland Under 20 Forwards Coach, New Zealand Rugby Performance Coach, Scotland Club International
- Kevin Park, Flanker, Glasgow
- Jim Fleming MBE, International Referee
- Peter Hoffmann (runner), former Boroughmuir High School rugby player international athlete and author
- Ronnie Browne, former winger and member of folk duo The Corries
