= Goldenacre Sports Ground =

Sports field in Edinburgh, Scotland

Coordinates: 55°58′9″N 3°12′17″W

- Goldenacre
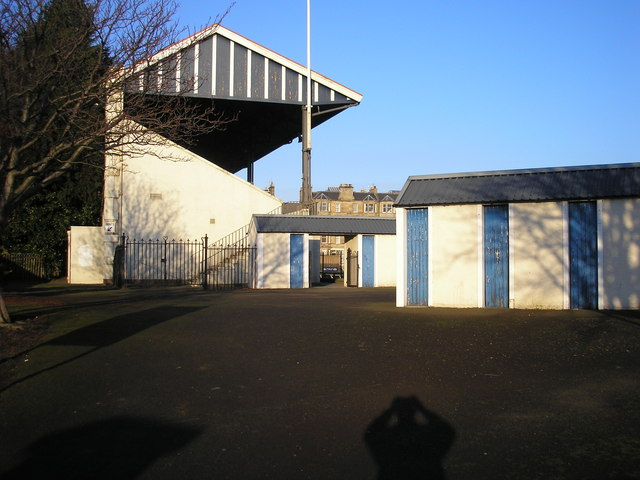
- Turnstiles and grandstand adjacent to the rugby pitch
- Location: Goldenacre Inverleith Row, Edinburgh
- Establishment: 1832
- Capacity: 3,500
- Owner: George Heriot's Trust
- End names
- n/a
- First T20I: 20 July 2023: Ireland v Italy
- Last T20I: 28 July 2023: Denmark v Jersey
- As of 28 July 2023; Source: ESPNcricinfo

The Goldenacre Sports Ground is located in the Goldenacre area of Edinburgh, Scotland. It is owned by the George Heriot's School. Several sports are played here including cricket, association football, tennis, and rugby. It is also the home ground of Heriot's Rugby Club and Heriot's Cricket Club.

The cricket pitch hosted seven matches (two of which are warm ups) for the 2015 ICC World Twenty20 Qualifier.

In the film Chariots of Fire, the Scotland v France International Athletics competition scene was shot at Goldenacre.
