= Super Series (Scottish rugby union competition) =

Scottish rugby union league

- Current season, competition or edition: 2023–24 Super Series
- Sport: Rugby union
- Founded: 2019 (7 years ago)
- Folded: 2024
- No. of teams: 7
- Country: Scotland
- Last champion: Stirling Wolves
- Most titles: 1 (Ayrshire Bulls, Watsonians, Stirling Wolves, Watsonians)
- Level on pyramid: 1
- Website: scottishrugby.org/super-series

The SRU Super Series, known as the FOSROC Super Series for sponsorship reasons, and prior to 2023 known as Super 6, was a semi-professional league for Scottish rugby union clubs, which ran between 2019 and 2024.

== History ==
Six clubs were awarded licences to play in the new Super 6 league by the Scottish Rugby Union. The intention was to bridge the gap between the amateur Scottish Premiership and the professional Pro14 (now the United Rugby Championship) to aid player progression. The six clubs were turned into semi-professional clubs, with part-time players and full-time coaches, and a squad budget of £125,000 each. Every team had a 35-man squad. The six core clubs signed a contract for five years, during which there would be no relegation or replacement. Scotland's two professional clubs, Edinburgh Rugby and Glasgow Warriors, could assign their players to the clubs below in a Pro-Draft; so that they could still play when not used by the professional sides.

The inaugural Super 6 tournament began in November 2019 after the rugby world cup of that year. The clubs would play 20 fixtures in total: 10 fixtures against one another home and away and then 2 play-off matches - which would conclude the Super 6 fixtures. A further 8 matches scheduled against non-Scottish clubs would then be played by the Super 6 clubs but this was to be outside the Super 6 competition. The first season was curtailed after the league finished, and there were no play-off matches due to the COVID-19 pandemic.

The tournament did not run at all in season 2020-21 due to the pandemic. The second Super 6 season was launched in July 2021, and the Ayrshire Bulls became the inaugural Super 6 champions after defeating The Southern Knights at Dam Park in the playoff final on 17 October 2021. In November 2021, plans were announced that the tournament would be expanded in 2022 to include two new teams, including one from Glasgow and English based RFU Championship London Scottish.However, plans for this did not come to fruition in time for the 2023 Season

The third Super 6 season was played between 5 August and 30 October 2022, with Watsonians defeating Ayrshire Bulls in the final. The fourth season, renamed the Super Series, ran between 28 July and 18 November 2023, and ended with Stirling Wolves defeating Ayrshire Bulls in the final. The competition was disbanded after the 2023-24 season, when the six core teams' contracts expired, to be replaced by a new male player pathway involving professional 'A' games, Scotland 'A' games, and expanded academies.

== Criticism ==
There were a number of controversies surrounding the creation of the new league. Some argued that the gap between the Scottish Premiership and Pro14 was not significant, and Scottish Premiership sides often played well against professional sides. Glasgow Hawks famously beat Toulouse in February 1998. Another criticism was of the geographical spread of the competition. No less than half the league's clubs were based in Edinburgh. There were no clubs from Scotland's biggest city, Glasgow, despite Glasgow Warriors regularly selling out Scotstoun Stadium and provided the Pro14 with their highest ever attendance for a final (Glasgow Hawks unsuccessfully applied to join). Similarly, there were no clubs from Aberdeen, Dundee or Inverness represented, although only Dundee HSFP applied to join out of the clubs from those cities. This, it was argued, would not help the game grow in Scotland. The initial money, capped by the Scottish Rugby Union, only provided players with a part-time wage, with most needing to secure other employment, which sceptics argued would not help the players' development.

== Format ==
- Super Series Sprint Season (previously Super6 Sprint) - running from April to June, involving a single round robin between the six core teams, with a single added game for each team against either Edinburgh Rugby A or Glasgow Warriors A, followed by two further matches to decide final positions; The URC 'A' sides were not themselves part of the competition, playing only three matches each, but the results against them formed part of the six main team's records.
- Super Series Championship, (previously Super6 Championship) the primary competition involving a full double round robin among the core six teams plus a Scotland Under 20 Development side, usually referred to as Futures XV, and a series of play-offs.

== Region ==
Location of teams in 2022–23 Super 6
Location of teams in 2022–23 Super 6 within Edinburgh

== Clubs ==
| Team | Stadium | Capacity | City/Area | Associate Club |
Super Series core clubs
| Ayrshire Bulls | Millbrae | 8,502 | Ayr, South Ayrshire | Ayr RFC |
| Boroughmuir Bears | Meggetland | 11,789 | Edinburgh | Boroughmuir RFC |
| Heriot's Rugby | Goldenacre | 10,098 | Edinburgh | Heriot's Rugby Club |
| Southern Knights | The Greenyards | 16,024 | Melrose, Scottish Borders | Melrose RFC |
| Stirling Wolves | Bridgehaugh Park | 10,589 | Stirling, Scotland | Stirling County RFC |
| Watsonian | Myreside | 13,799 | Edinburgh | Watsonian RFC |
Participating in the Super Series Championship only
| Futures XV (SCO U-20) | tba | tba | tba | SRU |
Participating in Super Series Sprint, but not part of League
| Edinburgh Rugby A | tba | tba | tba | Edinburgh Rugby |
| Glasgow Warriors A | tba | tba | tba | Glasgow Warriors |
