= 2012–13 Cornish Pirates RFC season =

2012–13 Cornish Pirates Rugby season
- Nickname: The Pirates
- Founded: 1945; 81 years ago
- Location: Penzance, Cornwall
- Ground: Mennaye Field (Capacity: 3,500)
- CEO: Rod Coward
- Coach: (Wales) Ian Davies (head coach)
- Captain: Gavin Cattle
- League: RFU Championship

Official website
- www.cornish-pirates.com

The 2012–13 season was the Cornish Pirates tenth season in the second tier of the English rugby union league system, the RFU Championship and their fourth in the British and Irish Cup.

== Pre–season friendlies ==
| Date | Opponents | H / A | Result | Score | Attendance | Match Report | Ref |
|---|---|---|---|---|---|---|---|
| 11 August | Loughborough Students | H | W | 36–7 | 868 | report | |
| 18 August | Exeter Chiefs | A | L | 3–56 | 4127 | report | |
| 25 August | Newport | H | W | 32–18 | 1139 | report | |

== RFU Championship ==
Stage one consists of twelve teams playing each of the other teams twice, once at home and once away, making a total of 22 games for each team. The league programme starts on Saturday, 1 September 2012 and will be completed by Saturday, 20 April 2013. The top four teams qualify for the two–legged semi–finals whilst the bottom team will be relegated to National League 1.

=== Stage one fixtures ===
| | Date | Opponents | H / A | Result | Score | Attendance | Position | Match Report | Ref |
| 1 | 1 September | Jersey | A | W | 20 – 6 | 2470 | 4th | report | |
| 2 | 6 September | Plymouth Albion | H | W | 19 – 17 | 2260 | 3rd | report | |
| 3 | 16 September | Bristol | A | L | 17 – 29 | 4613 | 6th | report | |
| 4 | 22 September | Newcastle Falcons | H | L | 3 – 25 | 1745 | 9th | report | |
| 5 | 28 September | Doncaster Knights | A | D | 18 – 18 | 1121 | 8th | report | |
| 6 | 6 October | London Scottish | A | L | 24 – 25 | 1126 | 8th | report | |
| 7 | 27 October | Leeds Carnegie | H | W | 21 – 8 | 1971 | 7th | report | |
| 8 | 3 November | Moseley | A | D | 9 – 9 | 1003 | 7th | report | |
| 9 | 10 November | Rotherham Titans | H | W | 53 – 21 | 1763 | 6th | report | |
| 10 | 23 November | Bedford Blues | A | L | 6 – 32 | 3155 | 7th | report | |
| 11 | 1 December | Nottingham | H | W | 11 – 10 | 1411 | 6th | report | |
| 12 | 26 December | Plymouth Albion | A | W | 9 – 5 | 3058 | 6th | report | |
| 13 | 1 January | Bristol | H | W | 32 – 17 | 2954 | 4th | report | |
| | 26 January | Newcastle Falcons | A | | P – P | | 6th | report | |
| 14 | 9 February | Doncaster Knights | H | W | 31 – 18 | 1309 | 4th | report | |
| 15 | 16 February | London Scottish | H | L | 17 – 20 | 1857 | 5th | report | |
| 16 | 22 February | Newcastle Falcons | A | L | 3 – 50 | 2208 | 5th | report | |
| 17 | 2 March | Leeds Carnegie | A | L | 27 – 35 | 1363 | 6th | report | |
| 18 | 9 March | Moseley | H | W | 17 – 14 | 1223 | 6th | report | |
| | 23 March | Rotherham Titans | A | | P – P | | | report | |
| 19 | 30 March | Bedford Blues | H | L | 18 – 26 | 2032 | 6th | report | |
| 20 | 5 April | Rotherham Titans | A | L | 28 – 41 | 1012 | 6th | report | |
| 21 | 14 April | Nottingham | A | L | 26 – 28 | 1469 | 6th | report | |
| 22 | 20 April | Jersey | H | W | 28 – 24 | 1959 | 6th | report | |

=== Stage one league table ===
2012–13 RFU Championship table
| Pos | Team | Pld | W | D | L | PF | PA | PD | TB | LB | Pts | Qualification |
|---|---|---|---|---|---|---|---|---|---|---|---|---|
| 1 | Newcastle Falcons (CH) | 22 | 21 | 0 | 1 | 677 | 252 | +425 | 13 | 1 | 98 | Promotion place |
| 2 | Nottingham (SF) | 22 | 15 | 0 | 7 | 624 | 409 | +215 | 10 | 4 | 74 | Promotion place |
| 3 | Bedford Blues (RU) | 22 | 14 | 1 | 7 | 664 | 485 | +179 | 11 | 2 | 71 | Promotion place |
| 4 | Leeds Carnegie (SF) | 22 | 13 | 0 | 9 | 585 | 480 | +105 | 9 | 6 | 67 | Promotion place |
| 5 | Bristol | 22 | 14 | 0 | 8 | 524 | 481 | +43 | 6 | 3 | 65 | |
| 6 | Cornish Pirates | 22 | 10 | 2 | 10 | 435 | 480 | −45 | 5 | 3 | 52 | |
| 7 | Rotherham Titans | 22 | 10 | 1 | 11 | 503 | 569 | −66 | 6 | 3 | 51 | |
| 8 | London Scottish | 22 | 10 | 0 | 12 | 456 | 610 | −154 | 4 | 4 | 45 (Note: London Scottish were deducted 3 competition points for fielding an ineligible player.) | |
| 9 | Plymouth Albion | 22 | 7 | 0 | 15 | 419 | 518 | −99 | 4 | 8 | 40 | |
| 10 | Moseley | 22 | 6 | 1 | 15 | 377 | 542 | −165 | 1 | 6 | 33 | |
| 11 | Jersey | 22 | 6 | 0 | 16 | 385 | 595 | −210 | 2 | 5 | 31 | |
| 12 | Doncaster Knights (R) | 22 | 3 | 1 | 18 | 364 | 592 | −228 | 2 | 7 | 23 | Relegation place |

Updated to match(es) played on 21 April 2013. Source: itsrugby.co.uk
Rules for classification: If teams are level at any stage, tiebreakers are applied in the following order:
1. Number of matches won
2. Difference between points for and against
3. Total number of points for
4. Aggregate number of points scored in matches between tied teams
5. Number of matches won excluding the first match, then the second and so on until the tie is settled
  Notes:

== British and Irish Cup ==
The 2012–13 British and Irish Cup is the fourth season of the annual rugby union competition for second tier, semi-professional and professional clubs from Britain and Ireland. First round matches began on the weekend of 13 October 2012 and the final will be on the weekend of 17 May 2013. The competition consists of eight groups of four teams playing each other twice to give each team six matches. The top team in each group qualifies for the quarter–finals and the final will be played at a venue to be decided when the finalists are known. The Pirates are in Pool 3.

=== Group stage ===
| Date | Opponents | H / A | Result | Score | Attendance | Match Report | Ref |
|---|---|---|---|---|---|---|---|
| 14 October | (Wales) Carmarthen Quins | H | W | 44 – 32 | 1469 | report | |
| 20 October | (Scotland) Dundee HSFP | A | W | 32 – 6 | 400 | report | |
| 9 December | (Wales) Swansea | H | W | 27 – 9 | 1356 | report | |
| 15 December | (Wales) Swansea | A | W | 30 – 10 | 350 | report | |
| 13 January | (Scotland) Dundee HSFP | H | W | 34 – 14 | 1536 | report | |
| 19 January | (Wales) Carmarthen Quins | A | L | 12 – 17 | 150 | report | |

| Team | P | W | D | L | PF | PA | PD | TF | TB | LB | Pts |
|---|---|---|---|---|---|---|---|---|---|---|---|
| (England) Cornish Pirates | 6 | 5 | 0 | 1 | 179 | 88 | 91 | 22 | 3 | 1 | 24 |
| (Wales) Carmarthen Quins | 6 | 4 | 0 | 2 | 150 | 123 | 27 | 16 | 2 | 1 | 19 |
| (Wales) Swansea | 6 | 2 | 0 | 4 | 98 | 137 | –39 | 11 | 1 | 0 | 9 |
| (Scotland) Dundee HSFP | 6 | 1 | 0 | 5 | 84 | 163 | –79 | 9 | 0 | 1 | 6 |
Points breakdown: *4 points for a win *2 points for a draw *1 bonus point for a loss by seven points or less *1 bonus point for scoring four or more tries in a match

=== Quarter–final ===
The quarter–finals were played on the weekend of 6 April and was decided by how well each group winner performed in the group matches. This is the third time in four seasons that the two teams have met with the Pirates winning the two previous encounters. Details of the full draw can be found at 2012–13 British and Irish Cup.

| Date | Opponents | H / A | Result | Score | Attendance | Match Report | Ref |
|---|---|---|---|---|---|---|---|
| 7 April | Munster A | H | L | 9–10 | 1478 | report | |

== Squad 2012–13 ==
Note: Flags indicate national union under World Rugby eligibility rules. Players may hold more than one non-World Rugby nationality.

| Player | Position | Union |
|---|---|---|
| Rob Elloway | Hooker | Germany |
| Darren Semmens | Hooker | England |
| Jack Yeandle (Exeter Chiefs) | Hooker | England |
| Paul Andrew | Prop | England |
| Lloyd Fairbrother (Exeter Chiefs) | Prop | England |
| Alan Paver | Prop | England |
| Ben Prescott | Prop | Scotland |
| Ryan Storer | Prop | England |
| Peter Joyce | Prop | England |
| Darren Barry | Lock | England |
| Gary Johnson | Lock | England |
| David Lyons | Lock | England |
| Laurie McGlone | Lock | New Zealand |
| Ian Nimmo | Lock | Scotland |
| Phil Burgess | Flanker | England |
| Dave Ewers (Exeter Chiefs) | Flanker | England |
| Chris Morgan | Flanker | England |
| Ben Maidment | Flanker | England |
| Owen Hambly (Redruth) | Flanker | England |
| Adam Clayton | Number 8 | England |
| Blair Cowan | Number 8 | New Zealand |
| Kyle Marriott | Number 8 | England |
| Tom Duncan (Redruth) | Number 8 | England |

| Player | Position | Union |
|---|---|---|
| Gavin Cattle | Scrum-half | Wales |
| Tom Kessell | Scrum-half | England |
| Kyle Moyle | Scrum-half | England |
| Johnny Bentley | Fly-half | New Zealand |
| Kieran Hallett | Fly-half | Ireland |
| Tom Bedford | Centre | England |
| Alex Cheesman | Centre | England |
| Junior Fatialofa | Centre | England |
| Sam Hill (Exeter Chiefs) | Centre | England |
| Tom Riley | Centre | Wales |
| Ben Mercer | Centre | England |
| Wes Davies | Wing | Wales |
| Grant Pointer | Wing | England |
| Ashley Smith (London Welsh RFC) | Wing | England |
| Charlie Walker–Blair (Exeter Chiefs) | Wing | England |
| Lewis Vinnicombe (Redruth) | Wing | England |
| Matt Evans | Fullback | Canada |
| Rob Cook | Fullback | England |
| Jack Nowell (Exeter Chiefs) | Fullback | England |

=== Dual registration ===
- David Ewers (Exeter Chiefs)
- Lloyd Fairbrother (Exeter Chiefs)
- Sam Hill (Exeter Chiefs)
- Charles Walker–Blair (Exeter Chiefs)
- Rob Cook (Gloucester)
- Jack Yeandle (Exeter Chiefs)
- Lewis Vinnicombe (Redruth)
- Owen Hambly (Redruth)
- Tom Duncan (Redruth)
- Ashley Smith (London Welsh)
- Jack Nowell

== Transfers 2012–13 ==
=== Players in ===
- (England) Tom Bedford (from (England) Newcastle Falcons)
- (England) Darren Berry (from (England) Bristol)
- (England) Alex Cheeseman (from (England) London Wasps)
- (England) Adam Clayton (from (England) Birmingham & Solihull Bees)
- (New Zealand) Alaifatu Junior Fatialofa (from (England) Bristol)
- (Republic of Ireland) Kieran Hallett (from (England) Nottingham)
- (England) Gary Johnson (from (England) London Welsh)
- (England) David Lyons (from (England) Moseley)
- (England) Kyle Moyle (from (England) St Ives)
- (Scotland) Ben Prescott (from (England) Northampton Saints and (England) Nottingham)
- (Wales) Tom Riley from ( (Wales) Newport Gwent Dragons)
- (England) Darren Semmems (from (England) Cornish All Blacks)
- (England) Peter Joyce (from (England) Redruth)
- (England) Ben Mercer (unregistered)

=== Players out ===
- (South Africa) Rudi Brits (released)
- (England) Rob Cook (to (England) Gloucester) (dual registration from 7 September)
- (England) Tom Cooper (to Jersey)
- (England) Tom Cowan–Dickie (to (England) Plymouth Albion and (England) Exeter Chiefs, dual registration)
- (Wales) Darren Daniel (released from contract in March 2012)
- (England) David Doherty (to (England) Leeds Carnegie)
- (England) James Doherty (to (England) Leeds Carnegie)
- (England) Drew Locke (to (England) Gloucester)
- (Wales) Rhodri McAtee (released and moving to (England) Plymouth Albion)
- (England) Mike Myerscough (to (England) Leeds Carnegie)
- (Scotland) Ian Nimmo (to (Wales) Newport Gwent Dragons)
- (England) Carl Rimmer (to (England) Exeter Chiefs)
- (England) Matt Smith (to (England) Leeds Carnegie)
- (United States) Andrew Suniula (released)
- (Wales) Ceiron Thomas (released and moving to (England) St Ives RFC)
- (England) Dave Ward (to (England) Harlequins)
- (England) Ryan Westren

== Coaching staff ==
- Ian Davies ( (Wales) ) (Head Coach) from April 2012. Previously Forwards Coach appointed in April 2009.
- Harvey Biljon ( (South Africa) ) (Backs Coach) appointed in April 2009.
- Simon Raynes ( (New Zealand) ) (Strength and Conditioning Coach) since summer 2005.

== See also ==
- 2012–13 RFU Championship
- 2012–13 British and Irish Cup
