= 2010–11 British and Irish Cup =

Tournament details
- Countries: England; Ireland; Scotland; Wales
- Tournament format(s): Round-robin and knockout
- Date: October 2010 - May 2011

Tournament statistics
- Teams: 24
- Matches played: 67
- Attendance: 81,295 (1,213 per match)
- Tries scored: 388 (5.79 per match)
- Top point scorer(s): James Pritchard (Bedford Blues) (128 points)
- Top try scorer(s): Handre Schmidt (Bedford Blues) (11 tries)

Final
- Venue: Memorial Stadium, Bristol
- Attendance: 4,375
- Champions: (England) Bristol (1st title)
- Runners-up: (England) Bedford Blues

The 2010–11 British and Irish Cup was the 2nd season of the annual rugby union competition for second tier, semi-professional clubs from Britain and Ireland. First round matches began on Friday 15 October 2010 and the final was held on Saturday 7 May 2011.

Defending champions Cornish Pirates were unable to make it out of the pool stages. Bristol lifted the cup, narrowly defeating Bedford Blues 17–14 in the first all-English final.

== Teams ==
The allocation of teams was as follows:

- (England) – 12 teams from RFU Championship
- (Ireland) – 3 Irish provinces represented by 'A' teams.
- (Scotland) – 3 Scottish sides, top clubs from the Scottish Premiership.
- (Wales) – 6 top clubs from the Principality Premiership.

| England | Ireland | Scotland | Wales |
|---|---|---|---|
| Bedford Blues; Birmingham & Solihull; Bristol; Cornish Pirates; Doncaster; Esher; London Welsh; Moseley; Nottingham; Plymouth Albion; Rotherham; Worcester Warriors | Leinster A; Munster A; Ulster Ravens | Ayr; Currie; Melrose | Llandovery; Llanelli; Neath; Newport; Pontypridd; Swansea |

== Competition format ==
The teams were divided into four pools of six, playing over five weekends during the Autumn International and Six Nations windows. The four pool winners and runners-up contested a knock-out stage, with quarter-finals on 5 or 6 March, semi-finals on 23 March and the final on 7 May.

== Pool stages ==
=== Pool A ===
| Pos | Team | Pld | W | D | L | PF | PA | PD | T | TB | LB | Pts |
|---|---|---|---|---|---|---|---|---|---|---|---|---|
| 1 | (England) Worcester Warriors | 5 | 4 | 0 | 1 | 175 | 87 | +88 | 22 | 3 | 0 | 19 |
| 2 | (Ireland) Leinster A | 5 | 4 | 0 | 1 | 138 | 117 | +21 | 18 | 3 | 0 | 19 |
| 3 | (England) Cornish Pirates | 5 | 3 | 0 | 2 | 175 | 108 | +67 | 23 | 4 | 1 | 17 |
| 4 | (Wales) Newport | 5 | 3 | 0 | 2 | 121 | 159 | −38 | 16 | 3 | 1 | 16 |
| 5 | (England) Plymouth Albion | 5 | 1 | 0 | 4 | 76 | 144 | −68 | 9 | 1 | 0 | 5 |
| 6 | (Scotland) Currie | 5 | 0 | 0 | 5 | 104 | 174 | −70 | 11 | 0 | 2 | 2 |

Rules for classification:
- 4 points for a win
- 2 points for a draw
- 1 bonus point for a loss by seven points or less
- 1 bonus point for scoring four or more tries in a match

17 October 2010
14:30

| Newport (Wales) | 28 – 33 | (Ireland) Leinster A |
| | Stats |

Rodney Parade
Attendance: 881

11 December 2010
13:00

| Worcester Warriors (England) | 58 – 10 | (Wales) Newport |
| | Stats |

Sixways
Attendance: 2,844

11 December 2010
14:00

| Leinster A (Ireland) | 25 – 16 | (England) Plymouth Albion |
| | Stats |

Greystones RFC
Attendance: 500

11 December 2010
15:00

| Cornish Pirates (England) | 54 – 31 | (Scotland) Currie |
| | Stats |

Mennaye Field
Attendance: 923

19 December 2010
14:00

| Cornish Pirates (England) | 43 – 12 | (Ireland) Leinster A |
| | Stats |

Mennaye Field
Attendance: 2,026

14 January 2011
19:30

| Currie (Scotland) | 23 – 25 | (Wales) Newport |
| | Stats |

Malleny Park
Attendance: 600

16 January 2011
13:00

| Leinster A (Ireland) | 38 – 23 | (England) Worcester Warriors |
| | Stats |

Donnybrook
Attendance: 485

16 January 2011
14:00

| Cornish Pirates (England) | 34 – 3 | (England) Plymouth Albion |
| | Stats |

Mennaye Field
Attendance: 2,207

21 January 2011
19:15

| Newport (Wales) | 34 – 32 | (England) Cornish Pirates |
| | Stats |

Rodney Parade
Attendance: 697

22 January 2011
15:00

| Worcester Warriors (England) | 34 – 11 | (England) Plymouth Albion |
| | Stats |

Sixways
Attendance: 3,830

23 January 2011
14:00

| Leinster A (Ireland) | 30 – 7 | (Scotland) Currie |
| | Stats |

Donnybrook
Attendance: 530

25 January 2011
19:45

| Plymouth Albion (England) | 13 – 24 | (Wales) Newport |
| | Stats |

The Brickfields
Attendance: 762

9 February 2011
19:30

| Currie (Scotland) | 16 – 32 | (England) Worcester Warriors |
| | Stats |

Watsonians RFC
Attendance: 400

26 February 2011
15:00

| Plymouth Albion (England) | 33 – 27 | (Scotland) Currie |
| | Stats |

The Brickfields
Attendance: 921

26 February 2011
15:00

| Worcester Warriors (England) | 28 – 12 | (England) Cornish Pirates |
| | Stats |

Sixways
Attendance: 4,042

=== Pool B ===
| Pos | Team | Pld | W | D | L | PF | PA | PD | T | TB | LB | Pts |
|---|---|---|---|---|---|---|---|---|---|---|---|---|
| 1 | (England) Bristol | 5 | 4 | 0 | 1 | 161 | 95 | +66 | 22 | 3 | 0 | 19 |
| 2 | (Wales) Llanelli | 5 | 4 | 0 | 1 | 123 | 66 | +57 | 14 | 2 | 0 | 18 |
| 3 | (Ireland) Munster A | 5 | 3 | 0 | 2 | 149 | 79 | +70 | 18 | 2 | 1 | 15 |
| 4 | (England) Nottingham | 5 | 2 | 0 | 3 | 128 | 103 | +25 | 18 | 3 | 2 | 13 |
| 5 | (Scotland) Melrose | 5 | 2 | 0 | 3 | 104 | 147 | −43 | 11 | 1 | 1 | 10 |
| 6 | (England) Esher | 5 | 0 | 0 | 5 | 46 | 221 | −175 | 3 | 0 | 1 | 1 |

Rules for classification:
- 4 points for a win
- 2 points for a draw
- 1 bonus point for a loss by seven points or less
- 1 bonus point for scoring four or more tries in a match

15 October 2010
19:30

| Munster A (Ireland) | 13 – 15 | (Wales) Llanelli |
| | Stats |

Waterford Sports Ground
Attendance: 1,500

10 December 2010
19:45

| Bristol (England) | 23 – 37 | (England) Nottingham |
| | Stats |

Memorial Stadium
Attendance: 1,912

11 December 2010
14:00

| Melrose (Scotland) | 14 – 47 | (Ireland) Munster A |
| | Stats |

The Greenyards
Attendance: 1,017

11 December 2010
15:00

| Esher (England) | 14 – 33 | (Wales) Llanelli |
| | Stats |

Molesey Road
Attendance: 812

3 January 2011
14:00

| Melrose (Scotland) | 24 – 18 | (England) Esher |
| | Stats |

The Greenyards
Attendance: 600

14 January 2011
19:45

| Esher (England) | 5 – 55 | (England) Bristol |
| | Stats |

Molesey Road
Attendance: 719

14 January 2011
19:45

| Nottingham (England) | 14 – 15 | (Ireland) Munster A |
| | Stats |

Meadow Lane
Attendance: 3,189

15 January 2011
13:30

| Llanelli (Wales) | 24 – 9 | (Scotland) Melrose |
| | Stats |

Carmarthen Park, Carmarthen

21 January 2011
19:30

| Munster A (Ireland) | 64 – 9 | (England) Esher |
| | Stats |

Garryowen RFC
Attendance: 500

23 January 2011
15:00

| Bristol (England) | 27 – 17 | (Wales) Llanelli |
| | Stats |

Memorial Stadium
Attendance: 2,228

23 January 2011
15:00

| Nottingham (England) | 29 – 31 | (Scotland) Melrose |
| | Stats |

Meadow Lane
Attendance: 913

22 February 2011
19:45

| Bristol (England) | 27 – 10 | (Ireland) Munster A |
| | Stats |

Memorial Stadium
Attendance: 2,364

23 February 2011
19:30

| Llanelli (Wales) | 34 – 3 | (England) Nottingham |
| | Stats |

Parc y Scarlets

26 February 2011
14:00

| Melrose (Scotland) | 26 – 29 | (England) Bristol |
| | Stats |

The Greenyards
Attendance: 594

26 February 2011
15:00

| Esher (England) | 0 – 45 | (England) Nottingham |
| | Stats |

Molesey Road
Attendance: 200

=== Pool C ===
| Pos | Team | Pld | W | D | L | PF | PA | PD | T | TB | LB | Pts |
|---|---|---|---|---|---|---|---|---|---|---|---|---|
| 1 | (England) Bedford Blues | 5 | 5 | 0 | 0 | 164 | 66 | +98 | 18 | 3 | 0 | 23 |
| 2 | (England) Moseley | 5 | 4 | 0 | 1 | 117 | 113 | +4 | 16 | 2 | 0 | 18 |
| 3 | (Wales) Neath | 5 | 3 | 0 | 2 | 78 | 76 | +2 | 9 | 0 | 2 | 14 |
| 4 | (England) London Welsh | 5 | 2 | 0 | 3 | 93 | 99 | −6 | 14 | 1 | 2 | 11 |
| 5 | (Ireland) Ulster Ravens | 5 | 1 | 0 | 4 | 109 | 128 | −19 | 13 | 1 | 2 | 7 |
| 6 | (Wales) Swansea | 5 | 0 | 0 | 5 | 61 | 140 | −79 | 7 | 0 | 2 | 2 |

Rules for classification:
- 4 points for a win
- 2 points for a draw
- 1 bonus point for a loss by seven points or less
- 1 bonus point for scoring four or more tries in a match

16 October 2010
14:30

| Swansea (Wales) | 12 – 32 | (Ireland) Ulster Ravens |
| | Stats |

St Helens
Attendance: 1,200

11 December 2010
14:00

| London Welsh (England) | 21 – 24 | (England) Moseley |
| | Stats |

Old Deer Park
Attendance: 675

11 December 2010
15:00

| Bedford Blues (England) | 36 – 22 | (Ireland) Ulster Ravens |
| | Stats |

Goldington Road
Attendance: 2,105

14 January 2011
19:00

| Ulster Ravens (Ireland) | 20 – 25 | (Wales) Neath |
| | Stats |

Instonians RFC
Attendance: 400

15 January 2011
15:00

| Bedford Blues (England) | 44 – 14 | (England) London Welsh |
| | Stats |

Goldington Road
Attendance: 2,416

15 January 2011
15:00

| Moseley (England) | 28 – 22 | (Wales) Swansea |
| | Stats |

Billesley Common
Attendance: 429

19 January 2011
19:30

| Neath (Wales) | 6 – 13 | (England) Bedford Blues |
| | Stats |

The Gnoll
Attendance: 1,000

22 January 2011
14:00

| London Welsh (England) | 29 – 11 | (Ireland) Ulster Ravens |
| | Stats |

Old Deer Park
Attendance: 785

22 January 2011
15:00

| Moseley (England) | 24 – 18 | (Wales) Neath |
| | Stats |

Billesley Common
Attendance: 526

8 February 2011
19:15

| Swansea (Wales) | 9 – 43 | (England) Bedford Blues |
| | Stats |

St Helens
Attendance: 800

15 February 2011
19:30

| Swansea (Wales) | 12 – 15 | (Wales) Neath |
| | Stats |

St Helens
Attendance: 250

23 February 2011
14:00

| Ulster Ravens (Ireland) | 24 – 26 | (England) Moseley |
| | Stats |

Ravenhill

25 February 2011
19:15

| Neath (Wales) | 14 – 7 | (England) London Welsh |
| | Stats |

The Gnoll
Attendance: 1,000

26 February 2011
15:00

| Bedford Blues (England) | 28 – 15 | (England) Moseley |
| | Stats |

Goldington Road
Attendance: 1,908

27 February 2011
14:00

| London Welsh (England) | 22 – 6 | (Wales) Swansea |
| | Stats |

Old Deer Park
Attendance: 237

=== Pool D ===
| Pos | Team | Pld | W | D | L | PF | PA | PD | T | TB | LB | Pts |
|---|---|---|---|---|---|---|---|---|---|---|---|---|
| 1 | (Wales) Pontypridd | 5 | 5 | 0 | 0 | 140 | 80 | +60 | 18 | 3 | 0 | 23 |
| 2 | (Scotland) Ayr | 5 | 3 | 1 | 1 | 93 | 101 | −8 | 13 | 0 | 0 | 14 |
| 3 | (England) Doncaster | 5 | 2 | 0 | 3 | 142 | 128 | +14 | 15 | 1 | 2 | 11 |
| 4 | (England) Birmingham & Solihull | 5 | 2 | 0 | 3 | 95 | 90 | +5 | 13 | 1 | 2 | 11 |
| 5 | (Wales) Llandovery | 5 | 2 | 0 | 3 | 92 | 106 | −14 | 9 | 0 | 1 | 9 |
| 6 | (England) Rotherham | 5 | 0 | 1 | 4 | 83 | 140 | −57 | 13 | 1 | 0 | 3 |

Rules for classification:
- 4 points for a win
- 2 points for a draw
- 1 bonus point for a loss by seven points or less
- 1 bonus point for scoring four or more tries in a match

16 October 2010
14:30

| Llandovery (Wales) | 18 – 28 | (Wales) Pontypridd |
| | Stats |

Church Bank
Attendance: 1,200

11 December 2010
14:00

| Rotherham (England) | 17 – 34 | (Wales) Llandovery |
| | Stats |

Clifton Lane
Attendance: 350

12 December 2010
12:30

| Pontypridd (Wales) | 33 – 12 | (Scotland) Ayr |
| | Stats |

The Memorial Ground
Attendance: 1,000

9 January 2011
15:00

| Birmingham & Solihull (England) | 35 – 29 | (England) Doncaster |
| | Stats |

Damson Park
Attendance: 317

- This fixture would double up as a cup and 2010–11 RFU Championship game after the cup game was initially postponed.

15 January 2011
14:30

| Pontypridd (Wales) | 21 – 12 | (England) Rotherham |
| | Stats |

Sardis Road
Attendance: 2,050

15 January 2011
15:00

| Llandovery (Wales) | 6 – 27 | (England) Doncaster |
| | Stats |

Church Bank

16 January 2011
15:00

| Birmingham & Solihull (England) | 12 – 18 | (Scotland) Ayr |
| | Stats |

Damson Park
Attendance: 350

22 January 2011
14:00

| Rotherham (England) | 20 – 20 | (Scotland) Ayr |
| | Stats |

Clifton Lane
Attendance: 587

22 January 2011
14:30

| Doncaster (England) | 23 – 35 | (Wales) Pontypridd |
| | Stats |

Castle Park
Attendance: 1,227

25 January 2011
19:45

| Pontypridd (Wales) | 23 – 15 | (England) Birmingham & Solihull |
| | Stats |

Sardis Road
Attendance: 1,200

12 February 2011
12:00

| Ayr (Scotland) | 20 – 19 | (Wales) Llandovery |
| | Stats |

Millbrae
Attendance: 670

14 February 2011
15:00

| Llandovery (Wales) | 15 – 14 | (England) Birmingham & Solihull |
| | Stats |

Church Bank
Attendance: 200

15 February 2011
19:30

| Doncaster (England) | 46 – 29 | (England) Rotherham |
| | Stats |

Castle Park
Attendance: 864

26 February 2011
12:00

| Ayr (Scotland) | 23 – 17 | (England) Doncaster |
| | Stats |

Millbrae
Attendance: 860

27 February 2011
15:00

| Birmingham & Solihull (England) | 19 – 5 | (England) Rotherham |
| | Stats |

Damson Park
Attendance: 300

== Knock-out stages ==
=== Qualifiers ===
The four pool winners and the four runners up proceeded to the knock out stages. The best four qualifiers (pool winners) had home advantage in the quarter-finals.

| Qualification | Team | Pld | W | D | L | PF | PA | PD | T | TB | LB | Pts |
|---|---|---|---|---|---|---|---|---|---|---|---|---|
| Pool C Winner | (England) Bedford Blues | 5 | 5 | 0 | 0 | 164 | 66 | +98 | 18 | 3 | 0 | 23 |
| Pool D Winner | (Wales) Pontypridd | 5 | 5 | 0 | 0 | 140 | 80 | +60 | 18 | 3 | 0 | 23 |
| Pool A Winner | (England) Worcester Warriors | 5 | 4 | 0 | 1 | 175 | 87 | +88 | 22 | 3 | 0 | 19 |
| Pool B Winner | (England) Bristol | 5 | 4 | 0 | 1 | 161 | 95 | +66 | 22 | 3 | 0 | 19 |
| Pool A Runner-up | (Ireland) Leinster A | 5 | 4 | 0 | 1 | 138 | 117 | +21 | 18 | 3 | 0 | 19 |
| Pool B Runner-up | (Wales) Llanelli | 5 | 4 | 0 | 1 | 123 | 66 | +57 | 14 | 2 | 0 | 18 |
| Pool C Runner-up | (England) Moseley | 5 | 4 | 0 | 1 | 117 | 113 | +4 | 16 | 2 | 0 | 18 |
| Pool D Runner-up | (Scotland) Ayr | 5 | 3 | 1 | 1 | 93 | 101 | −8 | 13 | 0 | 0 | 14 |

Quarter-finals
5 March 2011 - Sardis Road
(Wales) Pontypridd | 12
(Wales) Llanelli | 10
6 March 2011 - Memorial Stadium
(England) Bristol | 29
(Scotland) Ayr | 19
5 March 2011 - Goldington Road
(England) Bedford Blues | 50
(Ireland) Leinster A | 15
5 March 2011 - Sixways Stadium
(England) Worcester Warriors | 57
(England) Moseley | 15

Semi-finals
23 April 2011 - Sardis Road
(Wales) Pontypridd | 25
(England) Bristol | 36
23 April 2011 - Goldington Road
(England) Bedford Blues | 43
(England) Worcester Warriors | 27

Final
7 May 2011 - Memorial Stadium
(England) Bristol | 17
(England) Bedford Blues | 14

=== Quarter-finals ===
5 March 2011
14:30

| Pontypridd (Wales) | 12 - 10 | (Wales) Llanelli |
| Pen: Humberstone 5'c, 30'c, 68'c (3/3), Gunter 79'c (1/1) | Report; Stats | Try: Hopkins 38'c Con: Shingler (1/1); Drop: Shingler 76'c (1/1) |

Sardis Road, Pontypridd
Attendance: 1,400
Referee: Luke Pearce

5 March 2011
15:00

| Worcester Warriors (England) | 57 - 15 | (England) Moseley |
| Try: Sanderson 10'c, 24'c, Garvey 27'c, 38'c, Crockett 30'c, Frost 44'c, Grove 50'c, Shervington 74'm Con: Carlisle (7/8); Pen: Carlisle 20'c (1/1) | Report; Stats | Try: Sigley 64'm, Borgen 80'c Con: Thomas (1/2); Pen: Thomas 2'c (1/1) |

Sixways Stadium, Worcester
Attendance: 2,461
Referee: Leo Colgan

5 March 2011
15:00

| Bedford Blues (England) | 50 - 15 | (Ireland) Leinster A |
| Try: Schmidt 14'm, 20'm, 58'c, 64'c, Dodge 32'c, Thrower 79'c Con: Pritchard (4/6); Pen: Pritchard 19'c, 43'c, 46'c, 76'c (4/4) | Report; Stats | Try: Auva'a 53'c, 73'm Con: Madigan (1/2); Pen: Madigan 36'c (1/1) |

Goldington Road, Bedford
Attendance: 1,313
Referee: David Jones

6 March 2011
15:00

| Bristol (England) | 29 - 19 | (Scotland) Ayr |
| Try: Gadd 9'm, Merriman 15'c, 39'c, Watkins 41'c Con: Barnes (3/4); Pen: Barnes 5'm, 73'c (1/2) | Report; Stats | Try: Taylor 30'm, Manning 48'c, Ferguson 69'c Con: Curle (2/3); Pen: Curle 40'm (0/1) |

Memorial Stadium, Bristol
Attendance: 1,595
Referee: Neil Hennessey

=== Semi-finals ===
23 April 2011
14:30

| Pontypridd (Wales) | 25 - 36 | (England) Bristol |
| Try: Siggery 13'c, Humberstone 74'c, Waters 78'm Con: Humberstone (2/3); Pen: Humberstone 34'c, 39'c (2/2) | Report; Stats | Try: Norton 4'c, 69'c, Penalty try 15'c, Blaney 51'm, Watkins 64'c Con: Barnes (4/5); Pen: Barnes 3'c |

Sardis Road, Pontypridd
Attendance: 5,000
Referee: Leo Colgan

23 April 2011
15:00

| Bedford Blues (England) | 43 - 27 | (England) Worcester Warriors |
| Try: Seal 13'c, Tupai 17'c, 30'c, Rae 23'm, Pritchard 47'c, Thrower 60'c Con: Pritchard (5/6); Pen: Pritchard 53'c | Report; Stats | Try: Carlisle 4'c, Grove 6'c, King 76'c Con: Carlisle (2/2), Walker (1/1); Pen: Walker 26'c, 45'c (2/2) |

Goldington Road, Bedford
Attendance: 2,049
Referee: Michael Tutty

=== Final ===
7 May 2011
17:05

| Bristol (England) | 17 - 14 | (England) Bedford Blues |
| Try: Elliott 51'm Con: Barnes (0/1); Pen: Barnes 13'm, 33'c, 36'c, 40'c, 75'c (4/5) | Report; Stats | Try: Schmidt 80'm Con: Pritchard (0/1); Pen: Pritchard 9'c, 61'c, 64'm, 70'c (3/4) |

Memorial Stadium, Bristol
Attendance: 4,375
Referee: (Scotland) Andrew McMenemy

| FB | 15 | (England) George Watkins |
| RW | 14 | (England) Anthony Elliott |
| OC | 13 | (England) Jack Adams |
| IC | 12 | (New Zealand) Junior Fatialofa |
| LW | 11 | (England) Dan Norton |
| FH | 10 | (England) Ed Barnes |
| SH | 9 | (United States) Robbie Shaw | (substituted off) 80' |
| N8 | 8 | (Australia) Dan Montagu |
| OF | 7 | (Wales) James Merriman |
| BF | 6 | (England) Iain Grieve (c) |
| RL | 5 | (England) Roy Winters |
| LL | 4 | (Argentina) Mariano Sambucetti | (substituted off) 71' |
| TP | 3 | (England) Darren Crompton | (substituted off) 57' |
| HK | 2 | (Ireland) David Blaney |
| LP | 1 | (England) Mark Irish | (substituted off) 74' |
Replacements:
| HK | 16 | (England) Ollie Hayes |
| PR | 17 | (England) Wayne Thompson | (substituted on) 57' |
| PR | 18 | (England) Mako Vunipola | (substituted on) 74' |
| LK | 19 | (England) Darren Barry | (substituted on) 71' |
| N8 | 20 | (England) Marco Mama |
| SH | 21 | (England) Richard Bolt | (substituted on) 80' |
| FH | 22 | (England) Mark Davies |
Coach: (England) Paul Hull

| FB | 15 | (England) Edd Thrower | (substituted off) 52' |
| RW | 14 | (South Africa) Handre Schmidt |
| OC | 13 | (Australia) Myles Dorrian |
| IC | 12 | (England) Ollie Dodge |
| LW | 11 | (Canada) James Pritchard (c) |
| FH | 10 | (England) Jake Sharp |
| SH | 9 | (England) Will Chudley | (substituted off) 52' |
| N8 | 8 | (Samoa) Paul Tupai |
| OF | 7 | (England) Alex Rae | (yellow card) 39' to 49' |
| BF | 6 | (England) Gregor Gillanders | (substituted off) 71' |
| RL | 5 | (England) George Kruis |
| LL | 4 | (England) Mike Howard |
| TP | 3 | (England) Phil Boulton | (substituted off) 61' |
| HK | 2 | (England) Dan Richmond |
| LP | 1 | (England) Dan Seal |
Replacements:
| HK | 16 | (England) Chris Locke |
| PR | 17 | (England) Sam Walsh | (substituted on) 61' |
| LK | 18 | (Scotland) Sean Tomes | (substituted on) 71' |
| N8 | 19 | (England) Chris Goodman |
| SH | 20 | (South Africa) Darryl Veenendaal | (substituted on) 52' |
| CE | 21 | (England) Tom Bedford |
| WG | 22 | (England) Duncan Taylor | (substituted on) 52' |
Coach: (Wales) Mike Rayer

Touch judges:
(Scotland) Ian Heard
(Scotland) Graham Marshall

== Top scorers ==
=== Top points scorers ===
| Rank | Player | Team | Points |
|---|---|---|---|
| 1 | James Pritchard | (England) Bedford Blues | 128 |
| 2 | Joe Carlisle | (England) Worcester Warriors | 75 |
| 3 | Simon Humberstone | (Wales) Pontypridd | 61 |
| 4 | Ed Barnes | (England) Bristol | 58 |
| 5 | Handre Schmidt | (England) Bedford Blues | 55 |
| 6 | Hayden Abercrombie | (Scotland) Currie | 49 |
| 6 | Tristan Roberts | (England) Doncaster | 49 |
| 8 | Steven Shingler | (Wales) Llanelli | 47 |
| 9 | Rob Cook | (England) Cornish Pirates | 43 |
| 9 | Christian Lewis-Pratt | (England) Doncaster | 43 |
| 9 | Scott Wright | (Scotland) Melrose | 43 |

=== Top try scorers ===
| Rank | Player | Team | Tries |
|---|---|---|---|
| 1 | Handre Schmidt | (England) Bedford Blues | 11 |
| 2 | Andrew Conway | (Ireland) Leinster A | 6 |
| 2 | George Watkins | (England) Bristol | 6 |
| 4 | Wesley Davies | (England) Cornish Pirates | 5 |
| 5 | Anthony Elliott | (England) Bristol | 4 |
| 5 | Christian Lewis-Pratt | (England) Doncaster | 4 |
| 5 | Matt Scott | (Scotland) Currie | 4 |

== Geography ==
| Team | Stadium | Capacity | City/Area/Country |
|---|---|---|---|
| (Scotland) Ayr | Millbrae | Unknown | Alloway, South Ayrshire, Scotland |
| (England) Bedford Blues | Goldington Road | 5,000 (1,700 seats) | Bedford, Bedfordshire, England |
| (England) Birmingham & Solihull | Damson Park | 3,050 | Solihull, West Midlands, England |
| (England) Bristol | Memorial Stadium | 12,100 | Bristol, England |
| (England) Cornish Pirates | Mennaye Field | 3,500 | Penzance, Cornwall, England |
| (Scotland) Currie | Malleny Park | Unknown | Balerno, Edinburgh, Scotland |
| (England) Doncaster | Castle Park | 3,075 | Doncaster, South Yorkshire, England |
| (England) Esher | Molesey Road | Unknown | Esher, England |
| (Ireland) Leinster A | Donnybrook | 7,000 | Dublin, Leinster, Ireland |
| (Wales) Llandovery | Church Bank | 5,000 | Llandovery, Wales |
| (Wales) Llanelli | Parc y Scarlets | 14,870 | Llanelli, Carmarthenshire, Wales |
| (England) London Welsh | Old Deer Park | 5,850 (1,000 seats) | London, England |
| (Scotland) Melrose | The Greenyards | Unknown | Melrose, Scottish Borders, Scotland |
| (England) Moseley | Billesley Common | 3,000+ (650 seated) | Birmingham, West Midlands, England |
| (Ireland) Munster A | Musgrave Park | 8,300 | Cork, County Cork, Ireland |
| (Wales) Neath | The Gnoll | 7,500 | Neath, Neath Port Talbot, Wales |
| (Wales) Newport | Rodney Parade | 10,500 | Newport, Wales |
| (England) Nottingham | Meadow Lane | 19,588 | Nottingham, Nottinghamshire, England |
| (England) Plymouth Albion | The Brickfields | 6,500 | Plymouth, Devon, England |
| (Wales) Pontypridd | Sardis Road | 7,861 | Pontypridd, Rhondda Cynon Taf, Wales |
| (England) Rotherham | Clifton Lane | 2,500 | Rotherham, South Yorkshire, England |
| (Wales) Swansea | St Helens | 4,500 | Swansea, Wales |
| (Ireland) Ulster A | Ravenhill Stadium | 12,125 | Belfast, Ulster, Northern Ireland |
| (England) Worcester Warriors | Sixways Stadium | 12,068 | Worcester, England |
