= 2012–13 British and Irish Cup =

Tournament details
- Countries: England; Ireland; Scotland; Wales
- Tournament format(s): Round-robin and knockout
- Date: October 2012 — May 2013

Tournament statistics
- Teams: 32
- Matches played: 103
- Attendance: 106,987 (1,039 per match)
- Tries scored: 602 (5.84 per match)
- Top point scorer(s): James Pritchard (Bedford Blues) (88 points)
- Top try scorer(s): Mark Kohler (Bedford Blues); James Stephenson (Bedford Blues) (8 tries)

Final
- Venue: Kingston Park
- Attendance: 3,838
- Champions: (Ireland) Leinster A (1st title)
- Runners-up: (England) Newcastle Falcons

The 2012–13 British and Irish Cup was the fourth season of the annual rugby union competition for second tier, semi-professional clubs from Britain and Ireland. The final was contest on 17 May 2013 and won by Leinster A with a 78th minute penalty by Noel Reid to beat Newcastle Falcons 18–17 at their home ground Kingston Park. The defending champions Munster A were eliminated in the semi–finals by the eventual winners and Bedford Blues was the other losing semi–finalists.

There has been four different winners and four different losing finalist of the competition. The format of the competition has been considerably revamped, with expansion to 32 teams playing each other home and away in the pool stages. Previously, 24 teams played home or away in the pool stages. First round matches began on the weekend of 13/14 October 2012 and the final was held on 17 May 2013.

== Teams ==
The allocation of teams was as follows:

- (England) – 12 clubs from RFU Championship
- (Ireland) – 4 Irish provinces represented by 'A' teams
- (Scotland) – 4 top clubs from the Scottish Premiership
- (Wales) – 12 clubs from the Welsh Premier Division

England	Ireland	Scotland	Wales
Bedford Blues Bristol Cornish Pirates Doncaster Jersey (Note: Jersey is listed in the English section because they play in the English RFU Championship.) Leeds Carnegie London Scottish Moseley Newcastle Falcons Nottingham Plymouth Albion Rotherham	Connacht Eagles Leinster A Munster A Ulster Ravens	Dundee HSFP Gala Melrose Stirling County	Aberavon Bedwas Bridgend Ravens Cardiff Carmarthen Quins Cross Keys Llandovery Llanelli Neath Newport Pontypridd Swansea

== Competition format ==
The pool stage saw a considerable change in format and consisted of eight pools of four teams playing home and away matches. Pool matches took place on the same weekends as the Heineken and Amlin Cups. The top team from each pool qualified for the quarter-finals.

== Pool stages ==
The fixture weekends have been announced.

Round 6 matches were badly affected by adverse weather. Pitches were frozen or snow-covered, or teams were unable to travel.

=== Pool 1 ===
Team	Pld	W	D	L	PF	PA	PD	T	TB	LB	Pts
(England) Bristol	6	6	0	0	203	73	+130	26	3	0	27
(Ireland) Ulster Ravens	6	4	0	2	199	100	+99	26	5	2	23
(Wales) Bridgend Ravens	6	2	0	4	93	183	−90	7	0	0	8
(Wales) Cardiff	6	0	0	6	68	207	−139	7	0	0	0

Rules for classification: 4 points for a win; 2 points for a draw; 1 bonus point for a loss by seven points or less; 1 bonus point for scoring four or more tries in a match

13 October 2012
14:30

Cardiff (Wales)	14 – 23	(England) Bristol
	Cardiff; Bristol

Cardiff Arms Park
Attendance: 810
Referee: Cammy Rudkin (SRU)

13 October 2012
14:30

(TB) Ulster Ravens (Ireland)	49 – 19	(Wales) Bridgend Ravens
	Ulster; Bridgend

Deramore Park (Belfast Harlequins)
Attendance: 352
Referee: John Meredith (RFU)

20 October 2012
14:30

Bridgend Ravens (Wales)	25 – 7	(Wales) Cardiff
	Bridgend; Cardiff

Brewery Field
Attendance: 940
Referee: Simon Rees (WRU)

21 October 2012
15:00

Bristol (England)	34 – 28	(Ireland) Ulster Ravens (TB, LB)
	Bristol; Ulster

Memorial Stadium
Attendance: 4,003
Referee: Tim Hayes (WRU)

8 December 2012
14:30

Bridgend Ravens (Wales)	8 – 32	(England) Bristol (TB)
	Bridgend; Bristol

Brewery Field
Attendance: 1,149
Referee: Keiran Barry (IRFU)

8 December 2012
14:30

(TB) Ulster Ravens (Ireland)	40 – 14	(Wales) Cardiff
	Ulster; Cardiff

Ravenhill
Referee: Tom Foley (RFU)

14 December 2012
19:45

(TB) Bristol (England)	41 – 3	(Wales) Bridgend Ravens
	Bristol; Bridgend

Memorial Stadium
Attendance: 2,836
Referee: James Matthew (SRU)

15 December 2012
14:30

Cardiff (Wales)	7 – 34	(Ireland) Ulster Ravens (TB)
	Cardiff; Ulster

Cardiff Arms Park
Attendance: 216
Referee: Greg MacDonald (RFU)

11 January 2013
19:30

(LB) Ulster Ravens (Ireland)	8 – 12	(England) Bristol
	Ulster; Bristol

Deramore Park (Belfast Harlequins)
Attendance: 340
Referee: Johann van der Merwe (SRU)

12 January 2013
14:30

Cardiff (Wales)	14 – 24	(Wales) Bridgend Ravens
	Cardiff; Bridgend

Cardiff Arms Park
Attendance: 250
Referee: Simon Harding (RFU)

22 February 2013
19:45

(BP) Bristol (England)	61 – 12	(Wales) Cardiff
	Bristol; Cardiff

Memorial Stadium
Attendance: 2,013
Referee: Gary Conway (IRFU)

- This match was postponed from 20 January 2013 as the pitch was deemed frozen and the surrounding areas unsafe for supporters.

5 April 2013
19:30

Bridgend Ravens (Wales)	14 – 40	(Ireland) Ulster Ravens (TB)
	Bridgend; Ulster

Brewery Field
Referee: John Meredith (RFU)

- Match postponed from 19 January 2013 as Ulster were unable to fly due to the bad weather. Despite this match being a dead rubber (the outcome of this game will have no bearing on qualification for the knockout stages nor on the ranking of the qualifiers), the match was rearranged as Bridgend would lose revenue otherwise.

=== Pool 2 ===
Team	Pld	W	D	L	PF	PA	PD	T	TB	LB	Pts
(England) Bedford Blues	6	6	0	0	354	89	+265	55	6	0	30
(Scotland) Stirling County	6	2	0	4	141	228	−87	13	2	1	11
(Wales) Neath	6	3	0	3	137	229	−92	21	2	0	10 (Note: Neath were deducted 4 competition points for fielding two ineligible players.)
(Wales) Bedwas	6	1	0	5	116	222	−106	15	2	1	7

Rules for classification: 4 points for a win; 2 points for a draw; 1 bonus point for a loss by seven points or less; 1 bonus point for scoring four or more tries in a match
Notes:

13 October 2012
14:30

Bedwas (Wales)	23 – 48	(England) Bedford Blues (TB)
	Bedwas; Bedford

The Bridge Field
Attendance: 350
Referee: Sean Gallagher (IRFU)

13 October 2012
15:00

(TB) Stirling County (Scotland)	40 – 25	(Wales) Neath
	Stirling; Neath

Bridgehaugh
Attendance: 500
Referee: Tom Foley (RFU)

20 October 2012
14:30

(TB) Neath (Wales)	45 – 27	(Wales) Bedwas
	Neath; Bedwas

The Gnoll
Attendance: 1,100
Referee: Chris Williams (WRU)

20 October 2012
15:00

(TB) Bedford Blues (England)	87 – 10	(Scotland) Stirling County
	Bedford; Stirling

Goldington Road
Attendance: 2,801
Referee: Steve Lee (RFU)

8 December 2012
14:00

(TB) Stirling County (Scotland)	22 – 32	(Wales) Bedwas (TB)
	Stirling; Bedwas

Dunbar RFC
Attendance: 150
Referee: Andrew Jackson (RFU)

8 December 2012
14:30

Neath (Wales)	12 – 62	(England) Bedford Blues (TB)
	Neath; Bedford

The Gnoll
Attendance: 700
Referee: Cammy Rudkin (SRU)

15 December 2012
14:30

(TB, LB) Bedwas (Wales)	25 – 26	(Scotland) Stirling County
	Bedwas; Stirling

The Bridge Field
Attendance: 350
Referee: Eanna O'Dowd (IRFU)

15 December 2012
15:00

(TB) Bedford Blues (England)	69 – 23	(Wales) Neath
	Bedford; Neath

Goldington Road
Attendance: 2,004
Referee: Mark Patton (IRFU)

12 January 2013
14:00

(LB) Stirling County (Scotland)	21 – 24	(England) Bedford Blues (TB)
	Stirling; Bedford

Bridgehaugh
Attendance: 550
Referee: Nigel Correll (IRFU)

12 January 2013
14:30

Bedwas (Wales)	9 – 17	(Wales) Neath
	Bedwas; Neath

The Bridge Field
Attendance: 245
Referee: Justin Williams (WRU)

19 January 2013
14:00

(TB) Neath (Wales)	35 – 22	(Scotland) Stirling County
	Neath; Stirling

The Gnoll
Attendance: 700
Referee: Andrew Davies (WRU)

1 February 2013
19:30

(TB) Bedford Blues (England)	64 – 0	(Wales) Bedwas
	Bedford; Bedwas

Goldington Road
Attendance: 1,191
Referee: Darren Gamage (RFU)

- This match was originally scheduled to be played on 19 January 2013. Due to bad weather, the Bedwas team was unable to travel to Bedford.

=== Pool 3 ===
Team	Pld	W	D	L	PF	PA	PD	T	TB	LB	Pts
(England) Cornish Pirates	6	5	0	1	179	88	+91	22	3	1	24
(Wales) Carmarthen Quins	6	4	0	2	150	123	+27	16	2	1	19
(Wales) Swansea	6	2	0	4	98	137	−39	11	1	0	9
(Scotland) Dundee HSFP	6	1	0	5	85	163	−78	9	0	2	6

Rules for classification: 4 points for a win; 2 points for a draw; 1 bonus point for a loss by seven points or less; 1 bonus point for scoring four or more tries in a match

13 October 2012
14:30

(TB) Swansea (Wales)	43 – 17	(Scotland) Dundee HSFP
	Swansea; Dundee

St Helens
Attendance: 250
Referee: Eanna O'Dowd (IRFU)

14 October 2012
15:00

(TB) Cornish Pirates (England)	44 – 32	(Wales) Carmarthen Quins (TB)
	Pirates; Quins

Mennaye Field
Attendance: 1,469
Referee: Simon Harding (RFU)

19 October 2012
19:15

(TB) Carmarthen Quins (Wales)	41 – 17	(Wales) Swansea
	Quins; Swansea

Carmarthen Park
Attendance: 150
Referee: Cammy Rudkin (SRU)

20 October 2012
15:00

Dundee HSFP (Scotland)	6 – 32	(England) Cornish Pirates (TB)
	Dundee; Pirates

Mayfield Playing Fields
Attendance: 400
Referee: Stuart Gaffikin (IRFU)

8 December 2012
14:30

Carmarthen Quins (Wales)	20 – 17	(Scotland) Dundee HSFP (LB)
	Quins; Dundee

Carmarthen Park
Attendance: 150
Referee: Ross Campbell (RFU)

9 December 2012
14:00

Cornish Pirates (England)	27 – 9	(Wales) Swansea
	Pirates; Swansea

Mennaye Field
Attendance: 1,356
Referee: Greg MacDonald (RFU)

15 December 2012
14:00

Dundee HSFP (Scotland)	25 – 23	(Wales) Carmarthen Quins (LB)
	Dundee; Quins

Mayfield Playing Fields
Attendance: 400
Referee: Andrew Jackson (RFU)

15 December 2012
16:30

Swansea (Wales)	10 – 30	(England) Cornish Pirates
	Swansea; Pirates

St Helens
Attendance: 300
Referee: Nigel Correll (IRFU)

12 January 2013
14:30

Swansea (Wales)	8 – 17	(Wales) Carmarthen Quins
	Swansea; Quins

St Helens
Attendance: 250
Referee: Eddie Hogan-O’Connell (IRFU)

13 January 2013
14:00

(TB) Cornish Pirates (England)	34 – 14	(Scotland) Dundee HSFP
	Pirates; Dundee

Mennaye Field
Attendance: 1,536
Referee: Neil Perkins (WRU)

19 January 2013
14:00

Carmarthen Quins (Wales)	17 – 12	(England) Cornish Pirates (LB)
	Quins; Pirates

Carmarthen Park
Attendance: 316
Referee: Johann van der Merwe (SRU)

19 January 2013
14:00

(LB) Dundee HSFP (Scotland)	5 – 11	(Wales) Swansea
	Swansea

Mayfield Playing Fields
Attendance: 420
Referee: Nigel Correll (IRFU)

=== Pool 4 ===
Team	Pld	W	D	L	PF	PA	PD	T	TB	LB	Pts
(England) Newcastle Falcons	6	6	0	0	255	27	+228	38	5	0	27 (Note: Newcastle Falcons were deducted 2 competition points for fielding an ineligible player.)
(Wales) Newport	6	3	1	2	106	205	−99	11	0	0	14
(Wales) Cross Keys	6	1	1	4	88	180	−92	9	1	1	8
(Ireland) Connacht Eagles	6	1	0	5	91	128	−37	7	0	3	7

Rules for classification: 4 points for a win; 2 points for a draw; 1 bonus point for a loss by seven points or less; 1 bonus point for scoring four or more tries in a match
Notes:

13 October 2012
14:30

Newport (Wales)	18 – 14	(Ireland) Connacht Eagles (LB)
	Newport; Connacht

Rodney Parade
Attendance: 1,171
Referee: Greg MacDonald (RFU)

13 October 2012
15:00

(TB) Newcastle Falcons (England)	52 – 5	(Wales) Cross Keys
	Newcastle; Cross Keys

Kingston Park
Attendance: 3,561
Referee: Johann van der Merwe (SRU)

19 October 2012
19:45

Connacht Eagles (Ireland)	3 – 34	(England) Newcastle Falcons (TB)
	Connacht; Newcastle

Dubarry Park
Attendance: 250
Referee: Jason Bessant (WRU)

20 October 2012
14:30

(LB) Cross Keys (Wales)	20 – 24	(Wales) Newport
	Cross Keys; Newport

Pandy Park
Attendance: 525
Referee: Ross Campbell (RFU)

8 December 2012
14:00

Cross Keys (Wales)	17 – 12	(Ireland) Connacht Eagles (LB)
	Cross Keys

Pandy Park
Referee: Matthew Carley (RFU)

8 December 2012
14:30

Newport (Wales)	10 – 26	(England) Newcastle Falcons (TB)
	Newport; Newcastle

Rodney Parade
Attendance: 750
Referee: Eddie Hogan-O’Connell (IRFU)

15 December 2012
14:30

Connacht Eagles (Ireland)	31 – 16	(Wales) Cross Keys
	Connacht; Cross Keys

Dubarry Park
Referee: Michael Black (IRFU)

16 December 2012
15:00

(TB) Newcastle Falcons (England)	93 – 0	(Wales) Newport
	Newcastle; Newport

Kingston Park
Attendance: 3,947
Referee: Neil Perkins (WRU)

12 January 2013
14:30

Newport (Wales)	27 – 27	(Wales) Cross Keys (TB)
	Newport; Cross Keys

Rodney Parade
Attendance: 1,131
Referee: Darren Gamage(RFU)

12 January 2013
15:00

Newcastle Falcons (England)	16 – 6	(Ireland) Connacht Eagles
	Newcastle; Connacht

Kingston Park
Attendance: 3,819
Referee: Kevin White (SRU)

19 January 2013

Connacht Eagles (Ireland)	P – P	(Wales) Newport

Dubarry Park

- This match was postponed as the Newport team were unable to fly out of Bristol on 18 January due to snow

1 February 2013
19:00

Cross Keys (Wales)	3 – 34	(England) Newcastle Falcons (TB)
	Cross Keys; Newcastle

Pandy Park
Attendance: 226
Referee: Eanna O'Dowd (IRFU)

27 April 2013
14:30

(LB) Connacht Eagles (Ireland)	25 – 27	(Wales) Newport
	Connacht; Newport

Dubarry Park
Referee: Eanna O'Dowd (IRFU)

- This match was originally scheduled to be played on 19 January 2013 but was postponed due to heavy snow. The match was a dead rubber and the outcome had no bearing on qualification for the knockout stages nor on the ranking of the qualifiers.

=== Pool 5 ===
Team	Pld	W	D	L	PF	PA	PD	T	TB	LB	Pts
(Ireland) Leinster A	6	4	1	1	181	107	+74	24	3	1	22
(Wales) Pontypridd	6	4	1	1	157	113	+44	18	2	0	20
(England) Leeds Carnegie	6	1	1	4	134	177	−43	17	2	2	10
Jersey	6	1	1	4	107	182	−75	10	0	1	7

Rules for classification: 4 points for a win; 2 points for a draw; 1 bonus point for a loss by seven points or less; 1 bonus point for scoring four or more tries in a match

13 October 2012
15:00

Jersey	20 – 20	(Wales) Pontypridd
Try: Nicky Griffiths, Penalty Try; Con: Michael Le Bourgeois; Pen: Michael Le Bourgeois	Jersey; Pontypridd	Try: Craig Locke, Tom Pascoe; Con: Dai Flanagan 2 Pen: Dai Flanagan; Drop: Dai Flanagan

St. Peter
Attendance: 2,113
Referee: Nigel Correll (IRFU)

13 October 2012
19:00

(TB) Leinster A (Ireland)	47 – 18	(England) Leeds Carnegie
	Leinster; Leeds

Donnybrook
Attendance: 1,400
Referee: Jason Bessant (WRU)

20 October 2012
14:00

Pontypridd (Wales)	25 – 23	(Ireland) Leinster A (LB)
Try: Craig Locke, Dafydd Lockyer; Pen: Dai Flanagan 4 Drop: Dai Flanagan	Pontypridd; Leinster	Try: Andrew Boyle, Dan Leavy; Con: Noel Reid 2 Pen: Noel Reid 3

Sardis Road
Attendance: 3,000
Referee: John Meredith (RFU)

21 October 2012
15:00

(LB) Leeds Carnegie (England)	27 – 33	Jersey
	Leeds; Jersey

Clifton Park, York RUFC
Attendance: 820
Referee: Charles Samson (SRU)

8 December 2012
15:00

(LB) Jersey	12 – 16	(Ireland) Leinster A
	Jersey; Leinster

St. Peter
Attendance: 1,766
Referee: Simon Rees (WRU)

9 December 2012
15:00

(TB, LB) Leeds Carnegie (England)	24 – 30	(Wales) Pontypridd
	Leeds; Pontypridd

The Sycamores, West Park Leeds RUFC
Attendance: 1,392
Referee: James Matthew (SRU)

15 December 2012
14:30

(TB) Pontypridd (Wales)	25 – 8	(England) Leeds Carnegie
	Pontypridd; Leeds

Sardis Road
Attendance: 2,200
Referee: Wayne Davies (WRU)

16 December 2012
14:30

(TB) Leinster A (Ireland)	44 – 13	Jersey
	Leinster; Jersey

Donnybrook
Attendance: 450
Referee: Rhys Thomas (WRU)

12 January 2013
14:00

Leinster A (Ireland)	21 – 9	(Wales) Pontypridd
	Leinster; Pontypridd

Donnybrook
Attendance: 550
Referee: Steve Lee (RFU)

12 January 2013
16:00

Jersey	12 – 27	(England) Leeds Carnegie (TB)
	Jersey; Leeds

St. Peter
Attendance: 1,716
Referee: Andrew Jackson (RFU)

19 January 2013
12:45

Leeds Carnegie (England)	30 – 30	(Ireland) Leinster A (TB)
	Leeds; Leinster

The Sycamores, West Park Leeds RUFC
Referee: Simon Rees (WRU)

- This fixture was moved to South Leeds Stadium as the RFU Championship game against Plymouth (on 6 January 2013) went to uncontested scrums within 16 minutes on the new pitch at Headingley. Subsequently, the match was moved to West Park Leeds RUFC as the pitch at South Leeds Stadium was uncovered and frozen. Finally, the game went ahead on the 3G pitch.

5 April 2013
19:30

(TB) Pontypridd (Wales)	48 – 17	Jersey
	Pontypridd; Jersey

Sardis Road

- This match, originally scheduled for 19 January, was postponed due to the ground being under a seven to nine inch layer of snow and unplayable. Despite this match being a dead rubber (the outcome of this game will have no bearing on qualification for the knockout stages nor on the ranking of the qualifiers), the match was rearranged.

=== Pool 6 ===
Team	Pld	W	D	L	PF	PA	PD	T	TB	LB	Pts
(Wales) Llanelli	6	4	0	2	184	148	+36	22	3	0	19
(England) Moseley	6	4	0	2	134	146	−12	15	2	1	19
(England) London Scottish	6	2	0	4	151	128	+23	18	2	3	13
(Scotland) Gala	6	2	0	4	106	153	−47	13	1	1	10

Rules for classification: 4 points for a win; 2 points for a draw; 1 bonus point for a loss by seven points or less; 1 bonus point for scoring four or more tries in a match

13 October 2012
14:30

Gala (Scotland)	27 – 23	(England) London Scottish (LB)
	Gala; Scottish

Netherdale
Attendance: 2,000
Referee: Eddie Hogan-O'Connell (IRFU)

13 October 2012
15:00

(TB) Moseley (England)	36 – 26	(Wales) Llanelli
	Moseley; Llanelli

Billesley Common
Attendance: 580
Referee: Andrew Jackson (RFU)

20 October 2012
15:00

(TB, LB) London Scottish (England)	37 – 41	(England) Moseley (TB)
	Scottish; Moseley

Richmond Athletic Ground
Attendance: 1,078
Referee: Simon Harding (RFU)

20 October 2012
16:30

(TB) Llanelli (Wales)	38 – 28	(Scotland) Gala (TB)
	Llanelli; Gala

Parc y Scarlets
Attendance: 1,200
Referee: Nigel Correll (IRFU)

8 December 2012
15:00

Gala (Scotland)	18 – 11	(England) Moseley (LB)
	Gala; Moseley

Netherdale
Attendance: 1,600
Referee: Mark Patton (IRFU)

9 December 2012
14:30

London Scottish (England)	24 – 15	(Wales) Llanelli
	Scottish; Llanelli

Richmond Athletic Ground
Attendance: 721
Referee: Paul Haycock (IRFU)

15 December 2012
14:30

Llanelli (Wales)	32 – 23	(England) London Scottish
	Llanelli; Scottish

Parc y Scarlets
Attendance: 850
Referee: Tom Foley (RFU)

15 December 2012
15:00

Moseley (England)	16 – 13	(Scotland) Gala (LB)
	Moseley; Gala

Billesley Common
Attendance: 516
Referee: Simon Harding (RFU)

11 January 2013
19:30

Moseley (England)	13 – 12	(England) London Scottish (LB)
	Moseley; Scottish

Billesley Common
Attendance: 510
Referee: Simon Rees (WRU)

12 January 2013
15:00

Gala (Scotland)	20 – 33	(Wales) Llanelli (TB)
	Gala; Llanelli

Netherdale
Attendance: 1,000
Referee: Kieran Barry (IRFU)

19 January 2013
14:00

(TB) London Scottish (England)	32 – 0	(Scotland) Gala
	Scottish; Gala

Richmond Athletic Ground
Attendance: 1,178
Referee: Greg Morgan (WRU)

20 January 2013
14:30

(TB) Llanelli (Wales)	40 – 17	(England) Moseley
	Llanelli; Moseley

Parc y Scarlets
Referee: Lloyd Linton (SRU)

=== Pool 7 ===
Team	Pld	W	D	L	PF	PA	PD	T	TB	LB	Pts
(Ireland) Munster A	6	5	1	0	123	77	+46	15	1	0	23
(England) Rotherham	6	4	1	1	184	102	+82	22	2	0	20
(England) Plymouth Albion	6	2	0	4	131	141	−10	18	2	1	11
(Wales) Aberavon	6	0	0	6	73	191	−118	7	0	3	3

Rules for classification: 4 points for a win; 2 points for a draw; 1 bonus point for a loss by seven points or less; 1 bonus point for scoring four or more tries in a match

13 October 2012
14:30

(LB) Aberavon (Wales)	21 – 25	(England) Rotherham
	Aberavon; Rotherham

Talbot Athletic Ground
Attendance: 600
Referee: Charles Samson (SRU)

13 October 2012
15:00

(LB) Plymouth Albion (England)	22 – 26	(Ireland) Munster A
	Plymouth; Munster

The Brickfields
Attendance: 1,867
Referee: Gwyn Morris (WRU)

20 October 2012
13:00

Munster A (Ireland)	19 – 11	(Wales) Aberavon
	Munster; Aberavon

O'Dowd Park, Tralee RFC
Attendance: 400
Referee: Andrew Jackson (RFU)

20 October 2012
15:00

(TB) Rotherham (England)	59 – 26	(England) Plymouth Albion (TB)
	Rotherham; Plymouth

Clifton Lane
Attendance: 934
Referee: Johann van der Merwe (SRU)

8 December 2012
14:00

Rotherham (England)	21 – 36	(Ireland) Munster A (TB)
	Rotherham; Munster

Clifton Lane
Attendance: 1,014
Referee: Greg Morgan (WRU)

8 December 2012
14:30

(LB) Aberavon (Wales)	20 – 21	(England) Plymouth Albion
	Aberavon; Plymouth

Talbot Athletic Ground
Attendance: 328
Referee: Neil Perkins (WRU)

14 December 2012
19:00

Munster A (Ireland)	9 – 9	(England) Rotherham
	Munster; Rotherham

Musgrave Park
Attendance: 350
Referee: Simon Rees (WRU)

14 December 2012
19:45

(TB) Plymouth Albion (England)	59 – 0	(Wales) Aberavon
	Plymouth; Aberavon

The Brickfields
Attendance: 842
Referee: Matteo Liperini (FIR)

12 January 2013
14:30

(LB) Aberavon (Wales)	14 – 18	(Ireland) Munster A
	Aberavon; Munster

Talbot Athletic Ground
Attendance: 732
Referee: Ross Campbell (RFU)

12 January 2013
15:00

Plymouth Albion (England)	3 – 21	(England) Rotherham
	Plymouth; Rotherham

The Brickfields
Attendance: 1,037
Referee: Tom Foley (RFU)

18 January 2013
19:00

Munster A (Ireland)	15 – 0	(England) Plymouth Albion
	Munster; Plymouth

Cork Constitution FC, Temple Hill, Cork
Attendance: 1,450
Referee: Rhys Thomas (WRU)

23 February 2013
14:30

(BP) Rotherham (England)	49 – 7	(Wales) Aberavon
	Rotherham; Aberavon

Clifton Lane
Attendance: 738
Referee: Simon Harding (RFU)

- This match was postponed from 19 January 2013 due to a frozen pitch. Although this match is a dead rubber (the outcome of this game will have no bearing on qualification for the knockout stages nor on the ranking of the qualifiers), a new date was arranged.

=== Pool 8 ===
Team	Pld	W	D	L	PF	PA	PD	T	TB	LB	Pts
(England) Nottingham	6	4	0	2	167	128	+39	21	3	1	20
(Wales) Llandovery	6	4	0	2	149	123	+26	19	3	1	20
(England) Doncaster	6	2	0	4	132	123	+9	16	2	4	14
(Scotland) Melrose	6	2	0	4	121	195	−74	15	1	0	9

Rules for classification: 4 points for a win; 2 points for a draw; 1 bonus point for a loss by seven points or less; 1 bonus point for scoring four or more tries in a match

13 October 2012
14:30

(TB, LB) Doncaster (England)	29 – 30	(Scotland) Melrose
	Doncaster; Melrose

Castle Park
Attendance: 778
Referee: Simon Rees (WRU)

13 October 2012
15:00

Llandovery (Wales)	28 – 21	(England) Nottingham (LB)
	Llandovery; Nottingham

Church Bank
Attendance: 350
Referee: Tim Hayes (WRU)

19 October 2012
19:45

Nottingham (England)	13 – 27	(England) Doncaster
	Nottingham; Doncaster

Meadow Lane
Attendance: 1,034
Referee: Tom Foley (RFU)

20 October 2012
15:00

Melrose (Scotland)	14 – 29	(Wales) Llandovery (TB)
	Melrose; Llandovery

Greenyards
Attendance: 555
Referee: Sean Gallagher (IRFU)

7 December 2012
19:45

(TB) Nottingham (England)	54 – 24	(Scotland) Melrose (TB)
	Nottingham Melrose

Meadow Lane
Attendance: 981
Referee: Kelvin Shorte (WRU)

8 December 2012
15:00

(LB) Llandovery (Wales)	13 – 16	(England) Doncaster
	Llandovery; Doncaster

Church Bank
Referee: Simon Harding (RFU)

15 December 2012
13:45

Melrose (Scotland)	20 – 32	(England) Nottingham (TB)
	Melrose; Nottingham

Greenyards
Attendance: 568
Referee: Keiran Barry (IRFU)

15 December 2012
14:30

(TB, LB) Doncaster (England)	29 – 30	(Wales) Llandovery (TB)
	Doncaster; Llandovery

Castle Park
Attendance: 1,036
Referee: Ross Campbell (RFU)

12 January 2013
14:30

(LB) Doncaster (England)	12 – 14	(England) Nottingham
	Doncaster; Nottingham

Castle Park
Attendance: 1,174
Referee: Eanna O'Dowd (IRFU)

12 January 2013
15:00

(TB) Llandovery (Wales)	34 – 12	(Scotland) Melrose
	Llandovery; Melrose

Church Bank
Attendance: 600
Referee: Sean Brickell (WRU)

19 January 2013
13:45

Melrose (Scotland)	21 – 17	(England) Doncaster (LB)
	Melrose; Doncaster

Greenyards
Attendance: 367
Referee: Steve Lee (RFU)

24 February 2013
14:15

Nottingham (England)	31 – 15	(Wales) Llandovery
	Nottingham; Llandovery

Meadow Lane
Attendance: 878
Referee: Sean Gallagher (IRFU)

- This match was postponed from 19 January after a pitch inspection deemed it unfit.

== Knock–out stages ==
=== Qualifiers ===
The eight pool winners proceed to the knock out stages. The quarter-final matches were:

- Seed 1 v Seed 8
- Seed 2 v Seed 7
- Seed 3 v Seed 6
- Seed 4 v Seed 5

Teams are ranked by

1. Competition Points (4 for a win, 2 for a draw, etc)
2. where Competition Points are equal, greatest number of wins
3. where these are equal, aggregate points difference
4. where these are equal, greatest number of points scored

There are further criteria that can be applied if necessary.

Pool	Team	Pld	W	D	L	PF	PA	PD	T	TB	LB	Pts
2	(England) Bedford Blues	6	6	0	0	354	89	+265	55	6	0	30
4	(England) Newcastle Falcons	6	6	0	0	255	27	+228	38	5	0	27 (Note: Newcastle Falcons were deducted 2 competition points for fielding an ineligible player.)
1	(England) Bristol	6	6	0	0	203	73	+130	26	3	0	27
3	(England) Cornish Pirates	6	5	0	1	179	88	+91	22	3	1	24
7	(Ireland) Munster A	6	5	1	0	123	77	+46	15	1	0	23
5	(Ireland) Leinster A	6	4	1	1	181	107	+74	24	3	1	22
8	(England) Nottingham	6	4	0	2	167	128	+39	21	3	1	20
6	(Wales) Llanelli	6	4	0	2	184	148	+36	22	3	0	19

Rules for classification: 4 points for a win; 2 points for a draw; 1 bonus point for a loss by seven points or less; 1 bonus point for scoring four or more tries in a match
Notes:

Quarter-finals
6 April 2013 - Goldington Road
(England) Bedford Blues	32
(Wales) Llanelli	18
5 April 2013 - Kingston Park
(England) Newcastle Falcons	72
(England) Nottingham	17
7 April 2013 - Mennaye Field
(England) Cornish Pirates	9
(Ireland) Munster A	10
7 April 2013 - Memorial Stadium
(England) Bristol	26
(Ireland) Leinster A	30

Semi-finals
27 April 2013 - Goldington Road
(England) Bedford Blues	15
(England) Newcastle Falcons	18
26 April 2013 - Garryowen FC
(Ireland) Munster A	15
(Ireland) Leinster A	17

Final
17 May 2013 – Kingston Park
(England) Newcastle Falcons	17
(Ireland) Leinster A	18

=== Quarter-finals ===
5 April 2013
20:00

Newcastle Falcons (England)	72 – 17	(England) Nottingham
	Newcastle; Nottingham

Kingston Park
Attendance: 3,130
Referee: Tim Wigglesworth (RFU)

6 April 2013
15:00

Bedford Blues (England)	32 – 18	(Wales) Llanelli
	Bedford; Llanelli

Goldington Road
Attendance: 2,162
Referee: Sean Gallagher (IRFU)

7 April 2013
15:00

Bristol (England)	26 – 30	(Ireland) Leinster A
	Bristol; Leinster

Memorial Stadium
Attendance: 2,408
Referee: Andy McMenemy (SRU)

7 April 2013
15:00

Cornish Pirates (England)	9 – 10	(Ireland) Munster A
	Pirates; Munster

Mennaye Field
Attendance: 1,478
Referee: Ian Davies (WRU)

=== Semi-finals ===
26 April 2013
19:30

Munster A (Ireland)	15 – 17	(Ireland) Leinster A
	Munster; Leinster

Garryowen FC, Dooradoyle
Attendance: 1,350
Referee: Ian Tempest (RFU)

27 April 2013
15:00

Bedford Blues (England)	15 – 18	(England) Newcastle Falcons
	Bedford; Newcastle

Goldington Road
Attendance: 1,991
Referee: Mark Patton (IRFU)

=== Final ===
17 May 2013
19:30

Newcastle Falcons (England)	17 – 18	(Ireland) Leinster A
Try: Higgins 3' c Lawson 11' c Con: Hodgson (2/2); Pen: Hodgson (1) 3'	Newcastle; Leinster; Stats	Try: Carr 10' m Macken 27' c Con: Reid (1/2); Pen: Reid (2/2) 8', 78'

Kingston Park
Attendance: 3,838
Referee: Neil Hennessy (WRU)

== Top scorers ==
=== Top points scorers ===
Rank	Player	Team	Points
1	James Pritchard	(England) Bedford Blues	88
2	Noel Reid	(Ireland) Leinster A	83
3	Dai Flanagan	(Wales) Pontypridd	67
4	James Love	(England) London Scottish	66
5	Jack Maynard	(Wales) Carmarthen Quins	64
6	Jimmy Gopperth	(England) Newcastle Falcons	61
7	Joel Hodgson	(England) Newcastle Falcons	56
8	James McKinney	(England) Rotherham	54
8	Owen Williams	(Wales) Llanelli	54
10	Niall O'Connor	(Ireland) Ulster Ravens	52
10	Tristan Roberts	(England) Bristol	52

=== Top try scorers ===
Rank	Player	Team	Tries
1	Mark Kohler	(England) Bedford Blues	8
1	James Stephenson	(England) Bedford Blues	8
3	Josh Bassett	(England) Bedford Blues	7
4	Kevin James	(Wales) Neath	6
4	Brendan Macken	(Ireland) Leinster A	6
5	Chris Cochrane	(Ireland) Ulster Ravens	5
5	James Pritchard	(England) Bedford Blues	5
8	Leo Auva'a	(Ireland) Leinster A	4
8	Adam D'Arcy	(Ireland) Ulster Ravens	4
8	Jimmy Gopperth	(England) Newcastle Falcons	4
8	Corey Hircock	(Ireland) Munster A	4
8	David Jackson	(England) Nottingham	4
8	Alex Lewington	(England) Nottingham	4
8	Chris Morgans	(Wales) Neath	4
8	Craig Robertson	(Scotland) Gala	4
8	George Watkins	(England) Bristol	4
8	Curtis Wilson	(England) Leeds Carnegie	4

== Geography ==
Team	Stadium	Capacity	City/Area/Country
(Wales) Aberavon	Talbot Athletic Ground	3,000	Port Talbot, Neath Port Talbot, Wales
(England) Bedford Blues	Goldington Road	5,000 (1,700 seats)	Bedford, Bedfordshire, England
(Wales) Bedwas	The Bridge Field	Unknown	Bedwas, Caerphilly County Borough, Wales
(Wales) Bridgend Ravens	Brewery Field	8,000	Bridgend, Bridgend County Borough, Wales
(England) Bristol	Memorial Stadium	12,100	Horfield, Bristol, England
(Wales) Cardiff	Cardiff Arms Park	13,500	Cardiff, Wales
(Wales) Carmarthen Quins	Carmarthen Park	Unknown	Carmarthen, Carmarthenshire, Wales
(Ireland) Connacht Eagles	Dubarry Park	10,000	Athlone, Leinster, Ireland
(England) Cornish Pirates	Mennaye Field	4,000	Penzance, Cornwall, England
(Wales) Cross Keys	Pandy Park	Unknown	Crosskeys, Caerphilly County Borough, Wales
(England) Doncaster	Castle Park	3,075	Doncaster, South Yorkshire, England
(Scotland) Dundee HSFP	Mayfield Playing Fields	Unknown	Dundee, Scotland
(Scotland) Gala	Netherdale	6,000	Galashiels, Scottish Borders, Scotland
Jersey	St. Peter	5,000	Saint Peter, Jersey
(England) Leeds Carnegie	Headingley Stadium (Note: Leeds will play a number of their matches away from Headingley Stadium as part of a "strategy to grow our business by developing a closer partnership with all clubs in Yorkshire".: the match against Jersey (Sunday 21 October) at York R.U.F.C.; the match against Moseley (in the Championship, Sunday 11 November) at Wharfedale R.U.F.C.; the match against Bedford Blues (in the Championship, Sunday 2 December) at Otley R.U.F.C.; the match against Pontypridd (Sunday 9 December) at West Park Leeds R.U.F.C.; the match against London Scottish (in the Championship, Sunday 11 March) at Hull Ionians R.U.F.C.)	21,062	Headingley, Leeds, England
(Ireland) Leinster A	Donnybrook	7,000	Dublin, Leinster, Ireland
(Wales) Llandovery	Church Bank	5,000	Llandovery, Carmarthenshire, Wales
(Wales) Llanelli	Parc y Scarlets	14,870	Llanelli, Carmarthenshire, Wales
(England) London Scottish	Richmond Athletic Ground	4,500 (1,000 seats)	Richmond, London, England
(Scotland) Melrose	Greenyards	Unknown	Melrose, Scottish Borders, Scotland
(England) Moseley	Billesley Common	3,650	Birmingham, West Midlands, England
(Ireland) Munster A	Musgrave Park	8,300	Cork, County Cork, Ireland
(Wales) Neath	The Gnoll	7,500	Neath, Neath Port Talbot, Wales
(England) Newcastle Falcons	Kingston Park	10,200	Newcastle upon Tyne, England
(Wales) Newport	Rodney Parade	10,500	Newport, Wales
(England) Nottingham	Meadow Lane	19,588	Nottingham, Nottinghamshire, England
(England) Plymouth Albion	The Brickfields	8,500	Plymouth, Devon, England
(Wales) Pontypridd	Sardis Road	7,861	Pontypridd, Rhondda Cynon Taf, Wales
(England) Rotherham	Clifton Lane	2,500	Rotherham, South Yorkshire, England
(Scotland) Stirling County	Bridgehaugh	4,000	Stirling, Scotland
(Wales) Swansea	St Helens	4,500	Brynmill, Swansea, Wales
(Ireland) Ulster Ravens	Ravenhill	12,125	Belfast, Ulster, Northern Ireland
