= 2012–13 RFU Championship =

- Countries: England; Jersey
- Date: 31 August 2012 – 29 May 2013
- Champions: Newcastle Falcons
- Runners-up: Bedford Blues
- Relegated: Doncaster Knights
- Matches played: 138
- Attendance: 308,320 (average 2,234 per match)
- Highest attendance: 7,651 Newcastle Falcons at home to Bedford Blues on 29 May 2013
- Lowest attendance: 653 London Scottish at home to Moseley on 24 November 2012
- Tries scored: 691 (average 5 per match)
- Top point scorer: (New Zealand) Jimmy Gopperth (Newcastle Falcons) 298 points
- Top try scorer: (Canada) Matt Evans (Cornish Pirates) 14 tries

The 2012–13 RFU Championship is the fourth season of the professionalised format of the RFU Championship, the second tier of English domestic rugby union competitions, played between August 2012 and May 2013.

After an appeal, last season's champions, London Welsh were promoted to the Aviva Premiership and subsequently Newcastle Falcons relegated, due to finishing bottom of the Aviva Premiership during the 2011–12 season. On 8 May 2012 it was announced that only Bristol and London Welsh (subject to further developments) were eligible for promotion under the RFU's minimum standards criteria; London Welsh advanced to the Championship final, whilst Bristol were defeated in their semi-final by the Cornish Pirates, a club that could not meet the standards criteria. However, on 23 May, the day of the first leg of the final, the RFU announced that London Welsh would not be eligible for promotion due to "various failures". London Welsh's appeal was heard by an Independent Panel on 29 June which ruled ″... that the Exiles should be promoted on the basis that they play their home games at Oxford's Kassam Stadium and that the club meet the minimum entry criteria to the league as imposed by the Professional Game Board.″ Chief Executive Officer of the RFU, Ian Richie, subsequently announced that there would be a full review of the Minimum Standard Criteria. Esher dropped out of the Championship after being relegated to the 2013–14 National League 1 and they will be replaced by a club from the Channel Islands, Jersey who won National League 1 last season and will compete in the Championship for the first time after three consecutive promotions.

The twelve clubs in the 2012–13 Championship will also participate in the 2012–13 edition of the British and Irish Cup along with clubs from Wales, Scotland and Ireland.

On 30 August the RFU announced that, for the first time, a team coached by Mike Rayer of Bedford Blues and consisting of English Qualified Players from RFU Championship teams will play a touring team. The match took place on 17 November at Castle Park, Doncaster against the Māori All Blacks with the New Zealand team winning 52 – 21.

== Structure ==
The Championship's structure has all the teams playing each other on a home and away basis. The play–off structure has been changed dramatically for the 2012–13 season. Previously, the top eight teams entered into a complex mixture of pool and knockout play to determine promotion to the Premiership, whilst the bottom four entered into a pool whose last–placed team was relegated to National League 1. The play–off pools have been abolished beginning with this season. On the promotion side, the knockout stage, involving two–legged semi–finals followed by a two–legged final, will remain in place. Now, the top four teams at the end of the home–and–away season qualify for the promotion play–offs which follow a 1 v 4, 2 v 3 system. There will be no relegation play–offs; the bottom team will now be automatically relegated.

=== Competition funding ===
The RFU Championship clubs were in dispute with the RFU over funding for the competition and claimed that each club was owed £77,000 for the past three seasons and will be owed a further £120,000 over the next four seasons. The clubs also believed they should have received £295,000 in 2009–10, rising to £400,000 by 2015–16 and further believed there was a breach of contract on the part of the RFU. The RFU stated that the original funding was an estimate and by 2015–16 the figure will be £359,400. On 21 August the RFU unveiled the Championship funding structure for the next four seasons to 2015–16. The funding is based on the continuation of the "English Qualified Players scheme", where clubs are required to field fifteen English qualified players in the 22-man squad on each matchday. (In previous seasons teams were required to field fourteen.) Although the amount is not given in the press release, the RFU also stated they will "increase its financial underwritings in relation to a title sponsorship while efforts continue to secure a partner".

== Participating teams ==
Locations of the 2012–13 RFU Championship teams

Team	Stadium	Capacity	City/Area
Bedford Blues	Goldington Road	5,000 (1,700 seats)	Bedford, Bedfordshire
Bristol	Memorial Stadium	12,100	Bristol
Cornish Pirates	Mennaye Field	4,000 (2,200 Seats)	Penzance, Cornwall
Doncaster Knights	Castle Park	3,075	Doncaster, South Yorkshire
Jersey	St. Peter	5,000	Saint Peter, Jersey
Leeds Carnegie	Headingley Rugby Stadium	20,250	Leeds, West Yorkshire (Note: Leeds will play a number of their matches away from Headingley Stadium as part of a "strategy to grow our business by developing a closer partnership with all clubs in Yorkshire".: the match against Jersey (in the British and Irish Cup, Sunday 21 October) at York R.U.F.C.; the match against Moseley (Sunday 11 November) at Wharfedale R.U.F.C.; the match against Bedford Blues (Sunday 2 December) at Otley R.U.F.C.; the match against Pontypridd (in the British and Irish Cup, Sunday 9 December) at West Park Leeds R.U.F.C.; the match against London Scottish (Sunday 10 March) at Hull Ionians R.U.F.C.; Following problems with the newly re-laid pitch at Headingley, Leeds decided to play some more games "on the road": the replayed match against Plymouth Albion (Sunday 3 February) at West Park Leeds R.U.F.C.; the match against Newcastle Falcons (Sunday 10 February) at Otley R.U.F.C.; the match against Cornish Pirates (Sunday 3 March) at Otley R.U.F.C.)
London Scottish	Athletic Ground, Richmond	4,500 (1,000 seats)	Richmond, London
Moseley	Billesley Common	3,000	Birmingham, West Midlands
Newcastle Falcons	Kingston Park	10,200	Newcastle upon Tyne, Tyne and Wear
Nottingham	Meadow Lane	19,588	Nottingham, Nottinghamshire
Plymouth Albion	The Brickfields	8,500	Plymouth, Devon
Rotherham Titans	Clifton Lane	2,500	Rotherham, South Yorkshire

== League table ==
2012–13 RFU Championship table
Pos	Team	Pld	W	D	L	PF	PA	PD	TB	LB	Pts	Qualification
1	Newcastle Falcons (CH)	22	21	0	1	677	252	+425	13	1	98	Promotion place
2	Nottingham (SF)	22	15	0	7	624	409	+215	10	4	74	Promotion place
3	Bedford Blues (RU)	22	14	1	7	664	485	+179	11	2	71	Promotion place
4	Leeds Carnegie (SF)	22	13	0	9	585	480	+105	9	6	67	Promotion place
5	Bristol	22	14	0	8	524	481	+43	6	3	65	
6	Cornish Pirates	22	10	2	10	435	480	−45	5	3	52	
7	Rotherham Titans	22	10	1	11	503	569	−66	6	3	51	
8	London Scottish	22	10	0	12	456	610	−154	4	4	45 (Note: London Scottish were deducted 3 competition points for fielding an ineligible player.)	
9	Plymouth Albion	22	7	0	15	419	518	−99	4	8	40	
10	Moseley	22	6	1	15	377	542	−165	1	6	33	
11	Jersey	22	6	0	16	385	595	−210	2	5	31	
12	Doncaster Knights (R)	22	3	1	18	364	592	−228	2	7	23	Relegation place

Updated to match(es) played on 21 April 2013. Source: itsrugby.co.uk
Rules for classification: If teams are level at any stage, tiebreakers are applied in the following order:
1. Number of matches won
2. Difference between points for and against
3. Total number of points for
4. Aggregate number of points scored in matches between tied teams
5. Number of matches won excluding the first match, then the second and so on until the tie is settled
  Notes:

== Regular season ==
The 2012–13 RFU Championship kicked off on 31 August with Nottingham defeating Leeds Carnegie and will finish on 20 April 2013. Each team will play the other twice on a home and away basis with the top four qualifying for the promotion phase.

=== Round 1 ===
31 August 2012
19:45

Nottingham (BP)	34 – 29	Leeds Carnegie (BP)
	Report

Meadow Lane
Attendance: 1,536
Referee: Llyr ApGeraint Roberts

1 September 2012
15:00

Bedford Blues (BP)	50 – 6	Moseley
	Report

Goldington Road
Attendance: 2,104
Referee: John Meredith

1 September 2012
15:00

Jersey	6 – 20	Cornish Pirates
	Report

St Peter
Attendance: 2,470
Referee: Steve Lee

1 September 2012
15:00

Plymouth Albion	27 – 22	Doncaster Knights (BP)
	Report

Brickfields
Attendance: 1,364
Referee: David Rose

2 September 2012
14:00

London Scottish	26 – 20	Rotherham Titans (BP)
	Report

Athletic Ground, Richmond
Attendance: 894
Referee: Darren Gamage

2 September 2012
15:00

Bristol (BP)	20 – 37	Newcastle Falcons (BP)
	Report

Memorial Stadium
Attendance: 4,851
Referee: Tim Wigglesworth

=== Round 2 ===
7 September 2012
19:45

Doncaster Knights	9 – 18	Bristol
	Report

Castle Park
Attendance: 1,013
Referee: Darren Gamage

7 September 2012
20:00

Leeds Carnegie (BP)	32 – 19	Jersey
	Report

Headingley Rugby Stadium
Attendance: 2,066
Referee: Ian Tempest

8 September 2012
15:00

London Scottish (BP)	32 – 49	Newcastle Falcons (BP)
	Report

Athletic Ground, Richmond
Attendance: 1,380
Referee: Ross Campbell

8 September 2012
15:00

Moseley	17 – 28	Nottingham
	Report

Billesley Common
Attendance: 938
Referee: Sean Davey

9 September 2012
15:00

Rotherham Titans (BP)	38 – 38	Bedford Blues (BP)
	Report

Clifton Lane
Attendance: 1,198
Referee: Llyr ApGeraint Roberts

9 September 2012
15:00

Cornish Pirates	19 – 17	Plymouth Albion (BP)
	Report

Mennaye Field
Attendance: 2,260
Referee: Matthew Carley

=== Round 3 ===
14 September 2012
20:00

Newcastle Falcons (BP)	37 – 3	Doncaster Knights
	Report

Kingston Park
Attendance: 4,317
Referee: Ian Tempest

15 September 2012
15:00

Bedford Blues (BP)	55 – 20	London Scottish
	Report

Goldington Road
Attendance: 2,227
Referee: Matthew Carley

15 September 2012
15:00

Jersey	12 – 31	Moseley
	Report

St Peter
Attendance: 1,973
Referee: David Rose

15 September 2012
15:00

Plymouth Albion (BP)	32 – 31	Leeds Carnegie (2 BP)
	Report

Brickfields
Attendance: 1,862
Referee: Ross Campbell

16 September 2012
15:00

Nottingham	16 – 27	Rotherham Titans
	Report

Meadow Lane
Attendance: 2,078
Referee: Steve Lee

16 September 2012
15:15

Bristol	29 – 17	Cornish Pirates
	Report

Memorial Stadium
Attendance: 4,613
Referee: Sean Davey

=== Round 4 ===
22 September 2012
15:00

Bedford Blues	27 – 25	Nottingham (BP)
	Report

Goldington Road
Attendance: 2,298
Referee: Darren Gamage

22 September 2012
15:00

London Scottish (BP)	37 – 26	Doncaster Knights (BP)
	Report

Athletic Ground
Attendance: 1,029
Referee: Steve Lee

22 September 2012
15:00

Moseley (BP)	22 – 24	Plymouth Albion
	Report

Billesley Common
Attendance: 876
Referee: Ian Tempest

22 September 2012
15:00

Rotherham Titans (BP)	54 – 31	Jersey (BP)
	Report

Clifton Lane
Attendance: 1,131
Referee: Ross Campbell

23 September 2012
15:00

Cornish Pirates	3 – 25	Newcastle Falcons
	Report

Mennaye Field
Attendance: 1,745
Referee: Greg Macdonald

23 September 2012
15:00

Leeds Carnegie (BP)	50 – 31	Bristol (BP)
	Report

Headingley Rugby Stadium
Attendance: 2,854
Referee: Matthew Carley

=== Round 5 ===
28 September 2012
19:45

Bristol (BP)	21 – 22	Moseley
	Report

Memorial Ground
Attendance: 4,797
Referee: Ross Campbell

28 September 2012
19:45

Doncaster Knights	18 – 18	Cornish Pirates
	Report

Castle Park
Attendance: 1,121
Referee: Darren Gamage

28 September 2012
19:45

Nottingham (BP)	54 – 9	London Scottish
	Report

Meadow Lane
Attendance: 1,187
Referee: Ian Tempest

28 September 2012
19:45

Plymouth Albion	15 – 3	Rotherham Titans
	Report

Brickfields
Attendance: 2,213
Referee: David Rose

28 September 2012
20:00

Newcastle Falcons (BP)	53 – 10	Leeds Carnegie
	Report

Kingston Park
Attendance: 4,608
Referee: Luke Pearce

29 September 2012
15:00

Jersey	19 – 29	Bedford Blues (BP)

St Peter
Attendance: 2,071
Referee: Martin Fox

=== Round 6 ===
5 October 2012
20:00

Leeds Carnegie (BP)	42 – 7	Doncaster Knights
	Report

Headingley Rugby Stadium
Attendance: 2,255
Referee: Greg Macdonald

6 October 2012
15:00

Bedford Blues (BP)	55 – 17	Plymouth Albion
	Report

Goldington Road
Attendance: 2,725
Referee: Tim Wigglesworth

6 October 2012
15:00

London Scottish	25 – 24	Cornish Pirates (BP)
	Report

Athletic Ground
Attendance: 1,126
Referee: Ross Campbell

6 October 2012
15:00

Moseley	13 – 53	Newcastle Falcons (BP)
	Report

Billesley Common
Attendance: 1,091
Referee: Steve Lee

6 October 2012
15:00

Rotherham Titans	23 – 16	Bristol
	Report

Clifton Lane
Attendance: 1,060
Referee: John Meredith

7 October 2012
15:00

Nottingham (BP)	48 – 16	Jersey
	Report

Meadow Lane
Attendance: 1,483
Referee: Matthew Carley

=== Round 7 ===
26 October 2012
19:45

Doncaster Knights	24 – 16	Moseley
	Doncaster Moseley

Castle Park
Attendance: 872
Referee: Martin Fox

26 October 2012
20:00

Newcastle Falcons (BP)	33 – 0	Rotherham Titans
	Newcastle Rotherham

Kingston Park
Attendance: 3,518
Referee: Llyr ApGeraint Roberts

27 October 2012
14:00

Jersey	20 – 17	London Scottish (BP)
	Jersey Scottish

St. Peter
Attendance: 2,083
Referee: Luke Pearce

27 October 2012
15:00

Plymouth Albion	22 – 31	Nottingham (BP)
	Plymouth; Nottingham

Brickfields
Attendance: 1,589
Referee: Greg Macdonald

28 October 2012
14:30

Bristol	23 – 13	Bedford Blues
	Bristol Bedford

Memorial Stadium
Attendance: 4,609
Referee: Darren Gamage

28 October 2012
14:30

Cornish Pirates	21 – 8	Leeds Carnegie
	Pirates Leeds

Mennaye Field
Attendance: 1,971
Referee: David Rose

=== Round 8 ===
3 November 2012
14:00

Rotherham Titans (BP)	38 – 20	Doncaster Knights
	Doncaster Rotherham

Clifton Lane
Attendance: 1,876
Referee: Steve Lee

3 November 2012
15:00

Bedford Blues	20 – 29	Newcastle Falcons
	Bedford Newcastle

Goldington Road
Attendance: 4,067
Referee: Martin Fox

3 November 2012
15:00

Jersey	16 – 14	Plymouth Albion (BP)
	Jersey Plymouth

St Peter
Attendance: 1,894
Referee: Ian Tempest

3 November 2012
15:00

London Scottish	14 – 37	Leeds Carnegie (BP)
	Scottish Leeds

Athletic Ground
Attendance: 1,168
Referee: John Meredith

3 November 2012
15:00

Moseley	9 – 9	Cornish Pirates
	Moseley Pirates

Billesley Common
Attendance: 1,003
Referee: Matthew Carley

4 November 2012
15:00

Nottingham (BP)	63 – 7	Bristol
	Nottingham Bristol

Meadow Lane
Attendance: 2,091
Referee: Llyr ApGeraint Roberts

=== Round 9 ===
9 November 2012
19:45

Doncaster Knights (BP)	21 – 22	Bedford Blues
	Doncaster Bedford

Castle Park
Attendance: 908
Referee: Greg Macdonald

9 November 2012
19:45

Plymouth Albion	24 – 20	London Scottish (BP)
	Plymouth Albion London Scottish

Brickfields
Attendance: 1,941
Referee: Darren Gamage

9 November 2012
20:00

Newcastle Falcons (BP)	29 – 9	Nottingham
	Newcastle Nottingham

Kingston Park
Attendance: 3,458
Referee: Steve Lee

11 November 2012
14:00

Cornish Pirates (BP)	53 – 21	Rotherham Titans
	Cornish Pirates Rotherham

Mennaye Field
Attendance: 1,763
Referee: John Meredith

11 November 2012
15:00

Bristol (BP)	39 – 16	Jersey
	Bristol Jersey

Memorial Ground
Attendance: 4,620
Referee: Matthew Carley

11 November 2012
15:00

Leeds Carnegie (BP)	38 – 12	Moseley
	Leeds Moseley

Wharfeside Avenue, Threshfield
Attendance: 1,427
Referee: Ross Campbell

=== Round 10 ===
23 November 2012
19:45

Bedford Blues	32 – 6	Cornish Pirates
	Bedford Pirates

Goldington Road
Attendance: 3,155
Referee: Greg MacDonald

24 November 2012
12:15

London Scottish	23 – 18	Moseley (BP)
	Scottish; Moseley

Athletic Ground, Richmond
Attendance: 653
Referee: Matthew Carley

24 November 2012
14:00

Rotherham Titans	13 – 24	Leeds Carnegie
	Rotherham Leeds

Clifton Lane
Attendance: 1,489
Referee: Darren Gamage

24 November 2012
15:00

Jersey	3 – 24	Newcastle Falcons (BP)
	Jersey Newcastle

St Peter
Attendance: 2,292
Referee: Steve Lee

24 November 2012
15:00

Plymouth Albion	8 – 21	Bristol
	Plymouth Bristol

Brickfields
Attendance: 1,358
Referee: Ian Tempest

25 November 2012
15:00

Nottingham (BP)	52 – 7	Doncaster Knights
	Nottingham Doncaster

Meadow Lane
Attendance: 2,015
Referee: John Meredith

=== Round 11 ===
30 November 2012
19:45

Bristol (BP)	43 – 16	London Scottish
	Bristol; Scottish

Memorial Ground
Attendance: 4,682
Referee: Greg MacDonald

30 November 2012
19:45

Doncaster	22 – 17	Jersey (BP)
	Doncaster; Jersey

Castle Park
Attendance: 1,194
Referee: Darren Gamage

30 November 2012
20:00

Newcastle	31 – 15	Plymouth Albion
	Newcastle; Plymouth

Kingston Park
Attendance: 3,331
Referee: John Meredith

1 December 2012
12:45

Moseley (BP)	16 – 20	Rotherham Titans
	Moseley; Rotherham

Billesley Common
Attendance: 722
Referee: Steve Lee

2 December 2012
14:00

Cornish Pirates	11 – 10	Nottingham (BP)
	Pirates; Nottingham

Mennaye Field
Attendance: 1,411
Referee: Ross Campbell

2 December 2012
14:00

Leeds Carnegie	25 – 45	Bedford Blues (BP)
	Leeds; Bedford

Cross Green, Otley R.U.F.C.
Attendance: 1,546
Referee: Ian Tempest

=== Round 12 ===
22 December 2012
15:00

Jersey	20 – 17	Leeds Carnegie (BP)
	Jersey; Leeds

St Peter
Attendance: 1,923
Referee: Ross Campbell

23 December 2012
15:00

Bristol	26 – 18	Doncaster
	Bristol; Doncaster

Memorial Stadium
Attendance: 6,045
Referee: John Meredith

23 December 2012
15:00

Newcastle Falcons	12 – 9	London Scottish (BP)
	Newcastle; Scottish

Kingston Park
Attendance: 3,001
Referee: Matthew Carley

23 December 2012
15:00

Nottingham	18 – 9	Moseley
	Nottingham; Moseley

Meadow Lane
Attendance: 1,658
Referee: Darren Gamage

26 December 2012
15:00

Bedford	22 – 16	Rotherham (BP)
	Bedford; Rotherham

Goldington Road
Attendance: 4,418
Referee: Darren Gamage

26 December 2012
15:00

Plymouth Albion (BP)	5 – 9	Cornish Pirates
	Plymouth; Pirates

Brickfields
Attendance: 3,058
Referee: Greg MacDonald

=== Round 13 ===
1 January 2013
14:00

(BP) Cornish Pirates	32 – 17	Bristol
	Pirates Bristol

Mennaye Field
Attendance: 2,954
Referee: Steve Lee

1 January 2013
14:30

Doncaster Knights	10 – 28	Newcastle Falcons (BP)
	Doncaster; Newcastle

Castle Park
Attendance: 1,702
Referee: Ian Tempest

5 January 2013
14:00

Rotherham Titans	12 – 32	Nottingham (BP)
	Rotherham; Nottingham

Clifton Lane
Attendance: 1,498
Referee: Greg MacDonald

5 January 2013
15:00

London Scottish	26 – 23	Bedford Blues (BP)
	Scottish; Bedford

Athletic Ground, Richmond
Attendance: 1,705
Referee: John Meredith

5 January 2013
15:00

Moseley	23 – 19	Jersey (BP)
	Moseley; Jersey

Billesley Common
Attendance: 1,001
Referee: Luke Pearce

6 January 2013
15:00

Leeds Carnegie	R – R	Plymouth Albion

Headingley Rugby Stadium
Referee: Matthew Carley

- The original result was 34 – 16 to Leeds. However, the match went to uncontested scrums within 13 minutes on the new pitch at Headingley. A meeting of the Organising Committee of the Championship decided that the fixture should be replayed on the next available free weekend, being 1–3 February at a venue of Leeds' choice.

=== Round 14 ===
25 January 2013
19:45

Bristol	12 – 9	Leeds Carnegie (BP)
	Bristol; Leeds

Memorial Stadium
Attendance: 4,070
Referee: JP Doyle

25 January 2013
20:00

Newcastle Falcons	P – P	Cornish Pirates

Kingston Park

- Game postponed to 23 February 2013 after a pitch inspection (Kingston Park pitch snow-covered).

26 January 2013
14:30

Jersey	13 – 10	Rotherham Titans (BP)
	Jersey; Rotherham

St Peter
Attendance: 1,808
Referee: Steve Lee

26 January 2013
15:00

(BP) Plymouth Albion	6 – 9	Moseley
	Plymouth; Moseley

Brickfields
Attendance: 1,303
Referee: Ross Campbell

27 January 2013
14:45

Nottingham	25 – 17	Bedford Blues
	Nottingham; Bedford

Meadow Lane
Attendance: 2,136
Referee: Matthew Carley

1 February 2013
19:45

(BP) Doncaster Knights	9 – 14	London Scottish
	Doncaster; Scottish

Castle Park
Attendance: 706
Referee: Steve Lee

- Game postponed from 25 January due to concerns about the weather.

=== Round 13 replay ===
3 February 2013
14:30

(BP) Leeds Carnegie	28 – 26	Plymouth Albion (BP)
	Leeds Plymouth Albion

The Sycamores, West Park Leeds RUFC
Attendance: 1,460
Referee: Llyr ApGeraint Roberts

=== Round 15 ===
9 February 2013
12:15

London Scottish	25 – 13	Nottingham
	Scottish; Nottingham

Richmond Athletic Ground
Attendance: 1,266
Referee: Ross Campbell

9 February 2013
14:30

Rotherham Titans	34 – 31	Plymouth Albion (2 BP)
	Rotherham; Plymouth

Clifton Lane
Attendance: 935
Referee: John Meredith

9 February 2013
15:00

(BP) Bedford Blues	38 – 21	Jersey
	Bedford; Jersey

Goldington Road
Attendance: 2,242
Referee: Greg Macdonald

9 February 2013
15:00

Moseley	P – P	Bristol

Billesley Common
Referee: David Rose

- Game postponed to 15 March 2013 due to a water-logged pitch at Billesley Common.

10 February 2013
12:00

(BP) Leeds Carnegie	9 – 13	Newcastle Falcons
	Leeds; Newcastle

Cross Green, Otley R.U.F.C.
Attendance: 1,461
Referee: Darren Gamage

10 February 2013
14:30

(BP) Cornish Pirates	31 – 18	Doncaster Knights
	Pirates; Doncaster

Mennaye Field
Attendance: 1,309
Referee: Matthew Carley

=== Round 16 ===
15 February 2013
20:00

(BP) Newcastle Falcons	36 – 3	Moseley
	Newcastle; Moseley

Kingston Park
Attendance: 3,030
Referee: Llyr ApGeraint Roberts

16 February 2013
14:30

Doncaster Knights	23 – 17	Leeds Carnegie (BP)
	Doncaster; Leeds

Castle Park
Attendance: 1,271
Referee: Ross Campbell

16 February 2013
15:00

Jersey	P – P	Nottingham

St Peter

- Match postponed as the pitch was deemed unplayable.

16 February 2013
15:00

(2 BP) Plymouth Albion	27 – 28	Bedford Blues (BP)
	Plymouth; Bedford

Brickfields
Attendance: 1,548
Referee: Steve Lee

17 February 2013
14:30

(BP) Cornish Pirates	17 – 20	London Scottish
	Pirates; Scottish

Mennaye Field
Attendance: 1,857
Referee: Simon Harding

17 February 2013
15:00

(BP) Bristol	30 – 20	Rotherham Titans
	Bristol; Rotherham

Memorial Stadium
Attendance: 4,504
Referee: Matthew Carley

=== Round 14 catch up ===
23 February 2013
19:00

(BP) Newcastle Falcons	50 – 3	Cornish Pirates
	Falcons; Pirates

Kingston Park
Attendance: 2,208
Referee: Steve Lee

- Game rescheduled from 25 January 2013.

=== Round 17 ===
2 March 2013
14:00

(BP) London Scottish	41 – 33	Jersey (BP)
	Scottish; Jersey

Richmond Athletic Ground
Attendance: 1,552
Referee: Matthew Carley

2 March 2013
15:00

Bedford Blues	6 – 18	Bristol
	Bedford; Bristol

Goldington Road
Attendance: 2,933
Referee: Ian Tempest

2 March 2013
15:00

Moseley	23 – 9	Doncaster Knights
	Moseley; Doncaster

Billesley Common
Attendance: 1,030
Referee: Darren Gamage

2 March 2013
15:00

Rotherham Titans	22 – 34	Newcastle Falcons (BP)
	Rotherham; Falcons

Clifton Lane
Attendance: 1,890
Referee: Greg MacDonald

3 March 2013
14:30

Leeds Carnegie	37 – 25	Cornish Pirates
	Leeds; Pirates

Cross Green, Otley R.U.F.C.
Attendance: 1,363
Referee: John Meredith

3 March 2013
15:00

(BP) Nottingham	30 – 22	Plymouth Albion
	Nottingham; Plymouth

Meadow Lane
Attendance: 1,370
Referee: Simon Harding

=== Round 18 ===
8 March 2013
19:45

(BP) Bristol	19 – 23	Nottingham
	Bristol; Nottingham

Memorial Stadium
Attendance: 5,555
Referee: David Rose

8 March 2013
20:00

Newcastle Falcons	17 – 15	Bedford Blues (BP)
	Falcons; Bedford

Kingston Park
Attendance: 3,967
Referee: Llyr ApGeraint Roberts

9 March 2013
14:30

(BP) Doncaster Knights	19 – 25	Rotherham Titans
	Doncaster; Rotherham

Castle Park
Attendance: 1,517
Referee: Matthew Carley

9 March 2013
15:00

(BP) Plymouth Albion	15 – 19	Jersey
	Plymouth; Jersey

Brickfields
Attendance: 1,544
Referee: Steve Lee

10 March 2013
13:15

Cornish Pirates	17 – 14	Moseley (BP)
	Pirates; Moseley

Mennaye Field
Attendance: 1,223
Referee: Ross Campbell

10 March 2013
15:00

(BP) Leeds Carnegie	26 – 3	London Scottish
	Leeds; Scottish

Brantingham Park, Hull Ionians R.U.F.C.
Attendance: 1,261
Referee: Greg MacDonald

=== Round 15 and 16 catch up ===
15 March 2013
19:45

Moseley	23 – 14	Bristol
	Moseley; Bristol

Billesley Common
Attendance: 798
Referee: Llyr ApGeraint Roberts

- Game rescheduled from 9 February 2013.

16 March 2013
14:15

(BP) Jersey	13 – 20	Nottingham
	Jersey; Nottingham

St Peters
Attendance: 1,410
Referee: Martin Fox

- Game rescheduled from 16 February 2013.

=== Round 19 ===
22 March 2013
19:45

(BP) Nottingham	12 – 14	Newcastle Falcons
	Nottingham; Newcastle

Meadow Lane
Attendance: 2,516
Referee: Steve Lee

23 March 2013
15:00

Bedford Blues	P – P	Doncaster Knights

Goldington Road

- Postponed due to heavy overnight snowfall in Bedfordshire. Game rescheduled to 17 April.

23 March 2013
15:00

(BP) Jersey	23 – 29	Bristol
	Jersey; Bristol

St Peter
Attendance: 3,074
Referee: Ross Campbell

23 March 2013
15:00

(BP) London Scottish	9 – 16	Plymouth Albion
	Scottish; Plymouth

Richmond Athletic Ground
Attendance: 967
Referee: Thomas Foley

23 March 2013
15:00

Moseley	P – P	Leeds Carnegie

Billesley Common

- Postponed due to heavy snow in Birmingham. Game rescheduled to 5 April.

23 March 2013
15:00

Rotherham Titans	P – P	Cornish Pirates

Clifton Lane

- Postponed due to snowfall at Rotherham. Game rescheduled to 10 April.

=== Round 20 ===
29 March 2013
16:45

(BP) Doncaster Knights	21 – 27	Nottingham
	Doncaster; Nottingham

Castle Park
Attendance: 1,319
Referee: Llyr ApGeraint Roberts

29 March 2013
17:00

(BP) Newcastle Falcons	34 – 12	Jersey
	Newcastle; Jersey

Kingston Park
Attendance: 4,066
Referee: Marius Mitrea (FIR)

30 March 2013
15:00

(BP) Moseley	20 – 25	London Scottish
	Moseley; Scottish

Billesley Common
Attendance: 914
Referee: Simon Harding

31 March 2013
15:00

Cornish Pirates	18 – 26	Bedford Blues
	Pirates; Bedford

Mennaye Field
Attendance: 2,032
Referee: Greg MacDonald

31 March 2013
15:00

Leeds Carnegie	24 – 7	Rotherham Titans
	Leeds; Rotherham

Headingley Rugby Stadium
Attendance: 2,007
Referee: Darren Gamage

31 March 2013
16:05

(BP) Bristol	34 – 20	Plymouth Albion
	Bristol; Plymouth

Memorial Stadium
Attendance: 5,064
Referee: Luke Pearce

=== Round 19 postponed games ===
5 April 2013
19:45

Moseley	20 – 29	Leeds Carnegie (BP)
	Moseley; Leeds

Billesley Common
Attendance: 850
Referee: Llyr ApGeraint-Roberts

- Postponed from 23 March due to heavy snow in Birmingham.

10 April 2013
17:15

(BP) Rotherham Titans	41 – 28	Cornish Pirates (BP)
	Rotherham; Pirates

Clifton Lane
Attendance: 1,012
Referee: Dean Richards

- Postponed from 23 March due to snowfall at Rotherham.

=== Round 21 ===
13 April 2013
15:00

(BP) Bedford Blues	24 – 33	Leeds Carnegie
	Bedford; Leeds

Goldington Road
Attendance: 2,649
Referee: Ian Tempest

13 April 2013
15:00

Jersey	13 – 10	Doncaster Knights (BP)
	Jersey; Doncaster

St Peter
Attendance: 3,154
Referee: Andrew Small

13 April 2013
15:00

London Scottish	19 – 38	Bristol (BP)
	Scottish; Bristol

Richmond Athletic Ground
Attendance: 1,585
Referee: Darren Gamage

13 April 2013
15:00

Plymouth Albion	10 – 25	Newcastle Falcons
	Plymouth; Newcastle

Brickfields
Attendance: 2,211
Referee: Ross Campbell

13 April 2013
15:00

Rotherham Titans	26 – 22	Moseley (BP)
	Rotherham; Moseley

Clifton Lane
Attendance: 1,037
Referee: John Meredith

14 April 2013
13:15

(BP) Nottingham	28 – 26	Cornish Pirates (2 BP)
	Nottingham; Pirates

Meadow Lane
Attendance: 1,469
Referee: Luke Pearce

=== Round 19 postponed game ===
17 April 2013
19:45

(BP) Bedford Blues	38 – 26	Doncaster Knights (BP)
	Beford; Doncaster

Goldington Road
Attendance: 1,552
Referee: David Rose

- Postponed from 23 March due to heavy overnight snowfall in Bedfordshire.

=== Round 22 ===
20 April 2013
15:00

Cornish Pirates	28 – 24	Jersey (BP)
	Pirates; Jersey

Mennaye Field
Attendance: 1,955
Referee: Tom Foley

20 April 2013
15:00

(BP) Doncaster Knights	22 – 26	Plymouth Albion (BP)
	Doncaster; Plymouth

Castle Park
Attendance: 1,020
Referee: Simon Harding

20 April 2013
15:00

Leeds Carnegie	30 – 26	Nottingham (2BP)
	Leeds; Nottingham

Headingley Rugby Stadium
Attendance: 2,481
Referee: John Meredith

20 April 2013
15:00

(BP) Moseley	29 – 41	Bedford Blues (BP)
	Moseley; Bedford

Billesley Common
Attendance: 1,455
Referee: Matthew Carley

20 April 2013
15:00

(BP) Newcastle Falcons	14 – 19	Bristol
	Newcastle; Bristol

Kingston Park
Attendance: 4,590
Referee: Ian Tempest

20 April 2013
15:00

(BP) Rotherham Titans	33 – 26	London Scottish
	Rotherham; Scottish

Clifton Lane
Attendance: 1,463
Referee: Llyr ApGeraint-Roberts

== Play–offs ==
=== Semi–finals ===
The semi–finals followed a 1 v 4, 2 v 3 system - with the games being played over two legs and the higher placed team deciding who played at home in the first leg.

Newcastle Falcons finished the regular season in first place and played fourth-placed finishers Leeds Carnegie, with both matches being shown on SkySports. The other semi–final was between second placed Nottingham and Bedford who finished third.

Following the findings of an independent audit report, Leeds Carnegie, Newcastle Falcons and Nottingham Rugby met the "Minimum Standards Criteria" (MSC), and were eligible for promotion to the 2013–14 Aviva Premiership should they win the RFU Championship. Bedford Blues failed to meet the MSC but have the right to an appeal.

==== First leg ====
4 May 2013
15:00

Bedford Blues	26 – 17	Nottingham
	Bedford; Nottingham

Goldington Road
Attendance: 2,533
Referee: J P Doyle

6 May 2013
15:15

Leeds Carnegie	24 – 19	Newcastle Falcons
	Leeds; Newcastle

Headingley
Attendance: 4,259
Referee: David Rose

==== Second leg ====
10 May 2013
20:00

Nottingham	21 – 23	Bedford Blues
	Nottingham; Bedford

Meadow Lane
Attendance: 3,070
Referee: Martin Fox

- Bedford Blues won 49 – 38 on aggregate.

12 May 2013
13:15

Newcastle Falcons	15 – 6	Leeds Carnegie
	Newcastle; Leeds

Kingston Park
Attendance: 6,003
Referee: Wayne Barnes

- Newcastle Falcons won 34 – 30 on aggregate.

=== Final ===
23 May 2013
19:45

Bedford Blues	9 – 18	Newcastle Falcons
	Bedford; Newcastle

Goldington Road
Attendance: 4,588
Referee: Luke Pearce

29 May 2013
19:45

Newcastle Falcons	31 – 24	Bedford Blues
	Newcastle; Bedford

Kingston Park
Attendance: 7,651
Referee: Greg Garner

- Newcastle Falcons won 49 – 33 on aggregate and are promoted to the Aviva Premiership.

== Total attendances ==
Club	Home Matches	Total	Average	Highest	Lowest	% Capacity
Bedford Blues	13	39,667	3,051	4,588	1,552	61%
Bristol	11	53,410	4,855	6,045	4,070	40%
Cornish Pirates	11	20,480	1,862	2,954	1,223	47%
Doncaster Knights	11	13,639	1,240	1,702	872	40%
Jersey	11	24,152	2,196	3,154	1,410	44%
Leeds Carnegie	12	23,694	1,975	4,259	1,261	29%
London Scottish	11	13,325	1,211	1,705	653	27%
Moseley	11	10,678	971	1,455	722	32%
Newcastle Falcons	13	53,748	4,134	7,651	2,208	41%
Nottingham	12	22,609	1,884	3,070	1,187	10%
Plymouth Albion	11	19,991	1,817	3,058	1,303	21%
Rotherham Titans	11	14,589	1,326	1,890	935	53%

== Top scorers ==
=== Top points scorers ===
Rank	Player	Team	Points
1	(New Zealand) Jimmy Gopperth	Newcastle Falcons	298
2	(Japan) James Arlidge	Nottingham	246
3	(England) Joe Ford	Leeds Carnegie	222
4	(England) James Love	London Scottish	218
5	(Canada) James Pritchard	Bedford Blues	182
6	(England) Michael Le Bourgeois	Jersey	159
7	(Scotland) Garry Law	Rotherham	155
8	(Ireland) Keiran Hallett	Cornish Pirates	154
9	(England) Adrian Jarvis	Bristol	144
10	(England) Oliver Thomas	Moseley	142

=== Top try scorers ===
Rank	Player	Team	Tries
1	(Canada) Matt Evans	Cornish Pirates	14
2	(England) David Doherty	Leeds Carnegie	13
2	(New Zealand) Brent Wilson	Nottingham	13
4	(England) Josh Bassett	Bedford Blues	11
5	(England) Neil Cochrane	Bedford Blues	10
6	(England) Rhys Crane	Nottingham	8
6	(England) Sam Hocking	Plymouth Albion	8
6	(Scotland) Ally Hogg	Newcastle Falcons	8
6	(Scotland) Steve McColl	Leeds Carnegie	8
6	(England) James Stephenson	Bedford Blues	8

== RFU Championship XV ==
The RFU Championship fielded a representative team for the first time against the Maori All Blacks, a touring team from New Zealand.

17 November 2012
1205

RFU Championship XV (England)	21 – 52	Māori All Blacks

Castle Park, Doncaster

- See the main article RFU Championship XV for further details.

=== Other tour match ===
Newcastle Falcons played a match against Tonga on Tuesday 13 November 2012 winning 24 – 13.

- See 2012 end-of-year rugby union tests for details.

== Season records ==
=== Team ===
Largest home win – 56 pts

63 – 7 Nottingham at home to Bristol on 4 November 2012

Largest away win – 40 pts

53 - 13 Newcastle Falcons away to Moseley on 6 October 2012

Most points scored – 63 pts

63 – 7 Nottingham at home to Bristol on 4 November 2012

Most tries in a match – 9

Nottingham at home to Bristol on 4 November 2012

Most conversions in a match – 9

Nottingham at home to Bristol on 4 November 2012

Most penalties in a match – 7 (x3)

London Scottish at home to Rotherham Titans on 2 September 2012
Bedford Blues away to Newcastle Falcons on 29 April 2013
Newcastle Falcons at home to Bedford Blues on 29 April 2013

Most drop goals in a match – 2 (x2)

Rotherham Titans away to Cornish Pirates on 11 November 2012
Bedford Blues away to Newcastle Falcons on 8 March 2013

=== Player ===
Most points in a match – 29

(Scotland) Gary Law for Rotherham Titans at home to Jersey on 22 September 2012

Most tries in a match – 3 (x6)

(Canada) Matt Evans for Cornish Pirates away to Jersey on 1 September 2012
(Scotland) Ally Hogg for Newcastle Falcons away to London Scottish on 8 September 2012
(England) James Stephenson for Bedford Blues at home to London Scottish on 15 September 2012
(England) Charlie Hayter for Moseley away to Jersey on 15 September 2012
(England) Phil Burgess for Cornish Pirates at home to Rotherham Titans on 11 November 2012
(England) Johny Harris for Nottingham at home to Plymouth Albion on 3 March 2013

Most conversions in a match – 9

(Japan) James Arlidge for Nottingham at home to Bristol on 4 November 2012

Most penalties in a match — 7 (x3)

(England) James Love for London Scottish at home to Rotherham Titans on 2 September 2012
(England) Jake Sharp for Bedford Blues away to Newcastle Falcons on 29 April 2013
(New Zealand) Jimmy Gopperth for Newcastle Falcons at home to Bedford Blues on 29 April 2013

Most drop goals in a match — 2 (x2)

(Scotland) Gary Law for Rotherham Titans away to Cornish Pirates on 11 November 2012
(England) Mark Atkinson for Bedford Blues away to Newcastle Falcons on 8 March 2013

=== Attendances ===
Highest – 7,651

Newcastle Falcons at home to Bedford Blues on 29 May 2013

Lowest – 653

London Scottish at home to Moseley on 24 November 2012

Highest Average Attendance – 4,855

Bristol

Lowest Average Attendance – 971

Moseley

== See also ==
- 2012–13 British and Irish Cup
- 2012–13 Cornish Pirates RFC season
