= Fatialofa =

Fatialofa is a surname. Notable people with the surname include:

- Alaifatu Junior Fatialofa (born 1980), New Zealand rugby union player
- David Fatialofa, New Zealand rugby league player
- Peter Fatialofa (1959–2013), Samoan rugby union player

== See also ==
- Rita Fatialofa-Paloto (born 1963), Samoan netball and softball player
