= Tony Elliott =

Tony Elliott may refer to:

- Tony Elliott (publisher) (1947–2020), British founder and owner of the Time Out publishing company
- Tony Elliott (politician) (born 1944), Australian politician
- Tony Elliott (footballer) (born 1969), English football goalkeeper
- Tony Elliott (defensive lineman) (1959–2007), defensive lineman for the New Orleans Saints
- Tony Elliott (defensive back) (born 1964), defensive back for the Green Bay Packers
- Tony Elliott (American football coach) (born 1979), head American football coach for the University of Virginia

== See also ==
- Anthony Elliott, rugby union player
- Anthony Blacker Elliott, bishop in India
