= Chris Goodman =

English rugby union player

- Born: Chris Goodman; 6 July 1985 (age 41) Bath, Somerset
- Height: 6 ft 2 in (1.88 m)
- Weight: 105 kg (16 st 7 lb)
- School: King Edward's School, Bath

Rugby union career
- Position(s): Flanker, Number Eight
Senior career
Years	Team	Apps	(Points)
2003 - 09	Bath	47	(0)
2009 –	Bedford Blues		

Chris Goodman (born 6 July 1985 in Bath, Somerset, England) is a rugby union player for Bedford Blues in the RFU Championship.

Chris attended King Edward's School, Bath until the age of 18, and was 1st XV captain as No. 8. Upon leaving school, he signed professional terms with Bath Rugby, and developed through the club's Academy and into the first team squad. He made his 1st team debut against L'Aquila Rugby in the Parker Pen Challenge Cup. Chris Goodman's position of choice is as a back-row forward.

Goodman signed for the Bedford Blues in the summer of 2009.
