= Tom Riley (rugby union) =

- Born: Tom Riley; 4 May 1985 (age 41) Graig, Pontypridd, Wales
- Height: 185 cm (6 ft 1 in)
- Weight: 95 kg (14 st 13 lb)

Rugby union career
- Position: Centre
- Current team: Cornish Pirates
Senior career
Years	Team	Apps	(Points)
- Pontypridd
- Cardiff Blues
2008–2009	Newport RFC	27	(86)
2009–2012	Newport Gwent Dragons	60	(40)
2012–	Cornish Pirates		

Tom Riley (born 4 May 1985 in Graig, Pontypridd, Wales) is a rugby union player who plays at centre for the Cornish Pirates.

== Rugby career ==
Riley previously played for Pontypridd RFC, Cardiff Blues, Newport RFC and Newport Gwent Dragons, and has played for Wales at U18, U19 and U21 levels. Riley made his debut for Newport Gwent Dragons against Ulster on 6 September 2009. He signed an extended contract with Newport Gwent Dragons in January 2010. He was released by Newport Gwent Dragons at the end of the 2011–12 season and signed for the Cornish Pirates in June 2012.
