= Dai Flanagan =

Welsh rugby union footballer

- Born: David Flanagan; 24 October 1985 (age 41) Cefn Hengoed, Caerphilly, Wales
- Height: 6 ft 0 in (1.83 m)
- Weight: 13 st 8 lb (86 kg)

Rugby union career
- Position: Fly-half
Senior career
| Years | Team | Apps | (Points) |
| 2003–2010 | Pontypridd | | |
| 2006–2010 | Cardiff Blues | 18 | (28) |
| 2010–2012 | Ospreys | | |
| 2012–2014 | Pontypridd | | |
| 2014–? | Newport | | |
International career
| Years | Team | Apps | (Points) |
- Wales U16
- Wales U19
- Wales U21

David Flanagan (born 24 October 1985) is a rugby union coach and former player who is the head coach for Dragons RFC. As a player, he played as a fly-half for Pontypridd RFC, the Cardiff Blues and the Ospreys.

Born in Cefn Hengoed, Caerphilly, Flanagan began his career as a junior with Ystrad Mynach. After being selected for Wales at under-16 level, he was signed to the Pontypridd academy in 2002. He made his senior debut for Pontypridd during the 2003–04 season and was picked up by the Cardiff Blues academy at the start of the 2005–06 season. That proved to be his annus mirabilis, as he played for Wales at under-21 level, made his regional debut for the Blues and also scored the game-winning drop goal in injury time at the end of the 2006 Welsh Cup final against Neath.

After four years playing regional rugby with the Blues, Flanagan signed a three-year contract with the Ospreys for the 2010–11 season, where he would compete with Dan Biggar and James Hook as the team's starting fly-half. However, he left the Ospreys after just two years in July 2012, and returned to Pontypridd. Two years later, he left for Newport RFC, where he had already been working as the head of the Dragons academy at Newport High School.
