= Nicky Griffiths =

- Born: Nicky Griffiths; 7 April 1985 (age 41) Bridgend, Wales

Rugby union career
- Current team: Newport Gwent Dragons
Senior career
Years	Team	Apps	(Points)
2010-11	Newport GD	4	(0)
2011-	Jersey	58	(65)
- Correct as of 19 June 2011

Nicky Griffiths is a Welsh rugby union player. A scrum half, he is a former Wales Under-19, Under-21 and 7's international.

Griffiths started his career with Bridgend RFC before moving on the Ospreys, Cornish Pirates, Doncaster R.F.C. In June 2010 he joined Newport Gwent Dragons. He left Newport Gwent Dragons at the end of the 2010–11 season for Jersey He has become a fans favourite at the island club scoring many tries and winning the Player's Player of the year award for 2013.
