= Alex Cheesman =

English rugby union player

Alex Cheeseman
- Born: Alexander Cheeseman; 17 October 1988 (age 37) Hammersmith, London, England
- Height: 1.87 m (6 ft 2 in)
- Weight: 98 kg (15 st 6 lb)

Rugby union career
- Position: Flanker
Senior career
| Years | Team | Apps | (Points) |
| 2011–12 | London Wasps | 3 | (5) |
| – | Cornish Pirates | | |

Alexander Cheesman (born 17 October 1988 in London) is an English rugby player who currently plays for Cornish Pirates and formerly played for London Wasps.
