= Ed Shervington =

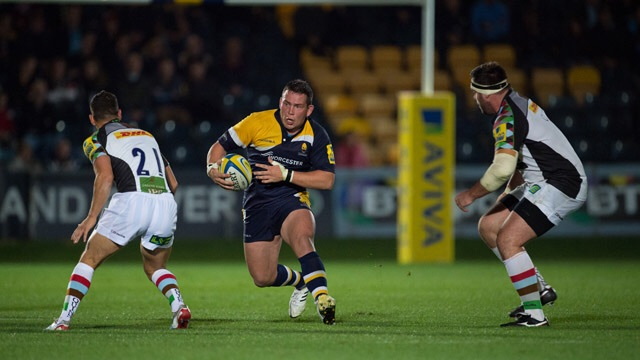
- Born: Ed Shervington; 11 March 1985 (age 41) Newport, Wales
- Height: 1.80 m (5 ft 11 in)
- Weight: 110 kg (240 lb; 17 st 5 lb)

Rugby union career
- Current team: Wasps
2006–2010	Ospreys	38	(5)
2010–2014	Worcester Warriors	95	(20)
2014–	Wasps	34	(0)
International career
Years	Team	Apps	(Points)
	Wales U18	8	(0)
–	Wales U19	10	(0)
–	Wales U21	13	(0)

Ed Shervington (born 11 March 1985, in Newport), is a Welsh rugby union player, in the position of hooker for Wasps

Born in Newport, Shervington debuted for Neath RFC 2003. After signing for Ospreys, he made his debut in September 2006, as a replacement against Ulster . Shervington was also allocated to play for Neath RFC in the Principality Premiership. Shervington has represented Wales at U18, U19 and U21 levels.

Shervington then joined Worcester Warriors. He enjoyed a memorable debut season during the 2010/11 campaign. He has gone on to make 65 appearances for Worcester Warriors during his first three seasons at the club and signed contract extensions in 2011 and 2013.

Shervington signed for Wasps in 2014 leaving Worcester Warriors after four seasons, making 95 appearances for the Midlands club. Shervington is noted in rugby circles for his unusually massive head.
