= David Lyons (rugby union, born 1985) =

English rugby union player

- Born: 10 May 1985 (age 41) Wolverhampton
- Height: 1.97 m (6 ft 6 in)
- Weight: 114.5 kg (18 st 0 lb)

Rugby union career
- Position: Lock
- Current team: London Scottish
Senior career
Years	Team	Apps	(Points)
- Coventry
2008–2009	Worcester Warriors		
2009–2012	Moseley		
2012–2013	Cornish Pirates		
2013-	London Scottish		

David Lyons (born 10 May 1985) is an English rugby union player for London Irish in the RFU Championship. He plays at lock. He previously played for the Worcester Warriors, Moseley and Cornish Pirates .
