= Greg King (rugby union) =

English rugby union player

Greg King (born 24 April 1988) is an English rugby union player, formerly of the Worcester Warriors in the Premiership. He moved to Moseley for the 2011-12 RFU Championship where he is currently captain of the first Team.

He plays at centre.
