= James Love (rugby union, born 1987) =

English rugby union player

James Love (born 20 October 1987 (age 38)) is a former English rugby union player who has previously starred for London Scottish.

== Early life and education ==
Born in Manama in Bahrain, Love started his rugby career in the UAE but when he began his education in the United Kingdom, moved his playing career to the UK.

Love started at the Royal Hospital School in 1999 and his ability in not only rugby but football and athletics was immediately picked up on. He began playing at Scrum-half where he developed his passing and kicking ability over the next few years and eventually played for the 2nd XV and 1st XV.

== Career ==
He started his professional career at Plymouth Albion Rugby Club.

In 2012, Love signed for London Scottish. In his first match for London Scottish, he won the Man of the Match award with 26 points. In 2014 he left London Scottish to join Ealing Trailfinders.

In 2016, he joined the Hong Kong Cricket Club's Rugby team.

In 2017, Love signed with the Jebel Ali Dragons RFC.

James has also played for the Arabian Gulf side in Rugby 7s.

== Statistics ==
Year	Club	Tries	Conversions	Penalties
2013–2014	London Scottish	0	0	0
2012–2013	London Scottish	3	34	67
2011–2012	Plymouth Albion	?	?	?
