= Anthony Elliott =

English rugby union player

- Born: 2 February 1981 (age 45) Stockton-on-Tees, County Durham, England
- Height: 6 ft 3 in (1.91 m)
- Weight: 14 st 9 lb (93 kg)

Rugby union career
- Position: Wing
Senior career
Years	Team	Apps	(Points)
2000–2003	Sale Sharks		
2003–2005	Rotherham R.U.F.C.		
2005–2007	Newcastle Falcons		
2007–2009	Bristol		
2009–2010	Bordeaux Bègles		
2010	Birmingham & Solihull R.F.C.		
2010–2012	Bristol		
2013-	Yarm Rugby Club		
National sevens team
Years	Team		Comps
2000/1, 2007/8	England		

Anthony Elliott (born 2 February 1981 in Stockton-on-Tees) is a rugby union footballer who plays on the wing for Bristol in the RFU Championship. He previously played for French Pro D2 side Bordeaux Bègles and Birmingham & Solihull R.F.C. He was released from his Bordeaux Begles contract in 2010 and signed for Birmingham & Solihull R.F.C.

In 2010 he married Abi Bannatyne, daughter of entrepreneur and media personality Duncan Bannatyne. The wedding took place just outside Cannes and was featured on Dragon's Den – What Happened Next – Duncan Bannatyne, in September 2010.

He joined Bristol for the second time on Thursday 21 October.
