= Alaifatu Junior Fatialofa =

- Born: 16 December 1980 (age 45) Wellington, New Zealand
- Height: 6 ft 1 in (1.85 m)
- Weight: 101 kg (223 lb; 15.9 st)

Rugby union career
- Position: Centre
Senior career
Years	Team	Apps	(Points)
- Bristol
–	Exeter Chiefs		

Alaifatu Junior Fatialofa (born 16 December 1980) was born in Wellington, New Zealand

He is a rugby union and played for Wellington Lions in the Air New Zealand NPC

Fatialofa played for Exeter Chiefs from 2004 to 2008 and signed for Bristol Rugby for 2008-2009 Guinness Premiership.
