= 2011–12 British and Irish Cup =

Tournament details
- Countries: England; Ireland; Scotland; Wales
- Tournament format(s): Round-robin and knockout
- Date: September 2011 - April 2012

Tournament statistics
- Teams: 24
- Matches played: 55
- Attendance: 48,328 (879 per match)
- Tries scored: 271 (4.93 per match)
- Top point scorer(s): Noel Reid (Leinster A) (80 points)
- Top try scorer(s): Kristian Baller (Cross Keys) (6 tries)

Final
- Venue: Musgrave Park, Cork
- Attendance: 2,500
- Champions: (Ireland) Munster A (1st title)
- Runners-up: (Wales) Cross Keys

The 2011–12 British and Irish Cup was the 3rd season of the annual rugby union competition for second tier, semi-professional clubs from Britain and Ireland. First round matches began on Wednesday 21 September 2011 and the final was held on Friday 27 April 2012.

Defending champions Bristol had a very poor campaign and were unable to make it out of the pool stages. Munster A lifted the cup, comfortably defeating Cross Keys 31–12 in the final. They became the first Irish side to claim the title, and the third different side to win in the competition's three-year history.

== Teams ==
The allocation of teams is as follows:

- (England) – 12 clubs from RFU Championship
- (Ireland) – 3 Irish provinces represented by 'A' teams.
- (Scotland) – 3 top clubs from the Scottish Premiership.
- (Wales) – 6 top clubs from the Welsh Premier Division.

England	Ireland	Scotland	Wales
Bedford Blues; Bristol; Cornish Pirates; Doncaster; Esher; Leeds Carnegie; London Welsh; London Scottish; Moseley; Nottingham; Plymouth Albion; Rotherham	Leinster A; Munster A; Ulster Ravens	Ayr; Currie; Melrose	Aberavon; Cross Keys; Llanelli; Neath; Pontypridd; Swansea

== Competition format ==
The pool stage saw a change in format and consisted of six pools of four teams playing cross-pool matches, giving each team two home and two away matches. Matches between English teams were played mid-week. Pool matches took place from 21 September to 18 December. The top team from each pool qualified for the quarter-finals, together with the two runners–up with the best records.

- Pool 1 teams Ayr, Cornish Pirates, Moseley and Neath, played the teams in Pool 2 Bristol Rugby, Cross Keys, Plymouth Albion and Munster
- Pool 3 teams Aberavon, Bedford Blues, Leinster and London Scottish, played the teams in Pool 4: Esher Rugby, Llanelli, London Welsh and Melrose
- Pool 5: Currie, Doncaster, Rotherham and Pontypridd, played the teams in Pool 6: Leeds Carnegie, Nottingham Rugby, Swansea and Ulster Ravens

== Pool stages ==
=== Pool 1 v Pool 2 ===
Pool 1
Team	Pld	W	D	L	PF	PA	PD	T	TB	LB	Pts
(England) Cornish Pirates	4	4	0	0	128	31	+97	17	2	0	18
(Scotland) Ayr	4	2	0	2	44	72	−28	4	0	1	9
(England) Moseley	4	2	0	2	46	106	−60	5	1	0	9
(Wales) Neath	4	1	0	3	62	108	−46	6	1	0	5

Rules for classification: 4 points for a win; 2 points for a draw; 1 bonus point for a loss by seven points or less; 1 bonus point for scoring four or more tries in a match

Pool 2
Team	Pld	W	D	L	PF	PA	PD	T	TB	LB	Pts
(Wales) Cross Keys	4	3	0	1	122	58	+64	15	3	0	15
(Ireland) Munster A	4	3	0	1	67	22	+45	6	1	1	14
(England) Plymouth Albion	4	1	0	3	66	91	−25	8	0	2	6
(England) Bristol	4	0	0	4	62	109	−47	7	0	2	2

Rules for classification: 4 points for a win; 2 points for a draw; 1 bonus point for a loss by seven points or less; 1 bonus point for scoring four or more tries in a match

21 September 2011
17:00

Cornish Pirates (England)	50 – 22	(England) Bristol
	Stats

Recreation Ground
Attendance: 1,612

21 September 2011
19:30

Moseley (England)	29 – 25	(England) Plymouth Albion
	Stats

Billesley Common
Attendance: 305

12 October 2011
19:45

Bristol (England)	10 – 14	(England) Moseley
	Stats

Memorial Stadium
Attendance: 2,023

12 October 2011
19:45

Plymouth Albion (England)	0 – 38	(England) Cornish Pirates
	Stats

The Brickfields
Attendance: 1,425

11 November 2011
19:00

Munster A (Ireland)	6 – 10	(England) Cornish Pirates
	Stats

Clonmel RFC
Attendance: 500

12 November 2011
15:00

Cross Keys (Wales)	42 – 3	(England) Moseley
	Stats

Pandy Park

12 November 2011
19:45

Plymouth Albion (England)	17 – 18	(Scotland) Ayr
	Stats

The Brickfields
Attendance: 1,077

13 November 2011
15:00

Bristol (England)	16 – 29	(Wales) Neath
	Stats

Memorial Stadium
Attendance: 2,865

19 November 2011
14:30

Neath (Wales)	9 – 23	(Ireland) Munster A
	Stats

The Gnoll

19 November 2011
15:00

Ayr (Scotland)	7 – 32	(Wales) Cross Keys
	Stats

Millbrae

10 December 2011
14:00

Munster A (Ireland)	9 – 3	(Scotland) Ayr
	Stats

Tralee RFC
Attendance: 400

10 December 2011
14:30

Cross Keys (Wales)	45 – 18	(Wales) Neath
	Stats

Pandy Park

17 December 2011
14:30

Ayr (Scotland)	16 – 14	(England) Bristol
	Stats

Millbrae

17 December 2011
15:00

Moseley (England)	0 – 29	(Ireland) Munster A
	Stats

Billesley Common
Attendance: 854

17 December 2011
15:00

Neath (Wales)	6 – 24	(England) Plymouth Albion
	Stats

The Gnoll
Attendance: 1,257

18 December 2011
14:00

Cornish Pirates (England)	30 – 3	(Wales) Cross Keys
	Stats

Mennaye Field
Attendance: 2,259

=== Pool 3 v Pool 4 ===
Pool 3
Team	Pld	W	D	L	PF	PA	PD	T	TB	LB	Pts
(Ireland) Leinster A	4	3	1	0	117	75	+42	13	2	0	16
(England) Bedford Blues	4	2	1	1	137	104	+33	19	1	1	12
(Wales) Aberavon	4	1	0	3	89	97	−8	12	1	1	6
(England) London Scottish	4	1	0	3	47	162	−115	4	0	0	4

Rules for classification: 4 points for a win; 2 points for a draw; 1 bonus point for a loss by seven points or less; 1 bonus point for scoring four or more tries in a match

Pool 4
Team	Pld	W	D	L	PF	PA	PD	T	TB	LB	Pts
(Wales) Llanelli	4	2	1	1	148	66	+82	16	2	1	13
(England) London Welsh	4	2	1	1	125	85	+40	12	1	1	12
(Scotland) Melrose	4	2	0	2	60	95	−35	7	0	0	8
(England) Esher	4	1	0	3	105	144	−39	15	2	0	6

Rules for classification: 4 points for a win; 2 points for a draw; 1 bonus point for a loss by seven points or less; 1 bonus point for scoring four or more tries in a match

21 September 2011
19:30

London Scottish (England)	9 – 44	(England) London Welsh
	Stats

Richmond Athletic Ground
Attendance: 853

21 September 2011
19:45

Bedford Blues (England)	62 – 30	(England) Esher
	Stats

Goldington Road
Attendance: 1,544

12 October 2011
19:30

London Welsh (England)	30 – 33	(England) Bedford Blues
	Stats

The Avenue, Sunbury
Attendance: 749

12 October 2011
19:45

Esher (England)	43 – 10	(England) London Scottish
	Stats

Molesey Road
Attendance: 539

12 November 2011
14:30

London Welsh (England)	27 – 19	(Wales) Aberavon
	Stats

Old Deer Park
Attendance: 840

12 November 2011
15:00

Esher (England)	18 – 32	(Ireland) Leinster A
	Stats

Molesey Road
Attendance: 914

13 November 2011
14:00

Llanelli (Wales)	63 – 0	(England) London Scottish
	Stats

Parc y Scarlets

13 November 2011
14:00

Melrose (Scotland)	19 – 17	(England) Bedford Blues
	Stats

The Greenyards
Attendance: 715

19 November 2011
14:30

Aberavon (Wales)	22 – 47	(Wales) Llanelli
	Stats

Talbot Athletic Ground
Attendance: 450

19 November 2011
18:00

Leinster A (Ireland)	42 – 20	(Scotland) Melrose
	Stats

Donnybrook
Attendance: 685

10 December 2011
14:00

Melrose (Scotland)	9 – 8	(Wales) Aberavon
	Stats

The Greenyards
Attendance: 497

11 December 2011
13:00

Llanelli (Wales)	13 – 19	(Ireland) Leinster A
	Stats

Parc y Scarlets

17 December 2011
14:30

Aberavon (Wales)	40 – 14	(England) Esher
	Stats

Talbot Athletic Ground
Attendance: 312

17 December 2011
15:00

Bedford Blues (England)	25 – 25	(Wales) Llanelli
	Stats

Goldington Road
Attendance: 1,900

17 December 2011
15:00

London Scottish (England)	28 – 12	(Scotland) Melrose
	Stats

Richmond Athletic Ground
Attendance: 1,060

18 December 2011
14:00

Leinster A (Ireland)	24 – 24	(England) London Welsh
	Stats

Donnybrook

=== Pool 5 v Pool 6 ===
Pool 5
Team	Pld	W	D	L	PF	PA	PD	T	TB	LB	Pts
(Wales) Pontypridd	4	2	0	2	90	61	+29	12	1	2	11
(England) Rotherham	4	1	0	3	57	76	−19	7	1	2	7
(England) Doncaster	4	1	0	3	76	114	−38	9	1	2	7
(Scotland) Currie	4	1	0	3	83	103	−20	8	1	1	6

Rules for classification: 4 points for a win; 2 points for a draw; 1 bonus point for a loss by seven points or less; 1 bonus point for scoring four or more tries in a match

Pool 6
Team	Pld	W	D	L	PF	PA	PD	T	TB	LB	Pts
(Ireland) Ulster Ravens	4	4	0	0	115	60	+55	14	2	0	18
(England) Nottingham	4	4	0	0	98	79	+19	10	1	0	17
(England) Leeds Carnegie	4	2	0	2	77	61	+16	12	1	1	10
(Wales) Swansea	4	1	0	3	64	106	−42	6	0	1	5

Rules for classification: 4 points for a win; 2 points for a draw; 1 bonus point for a loss by seven points or less; 1 bonus point for scoring four or more tries in a match

21 September 2011
19:30

Leeds Carnegie (England)	17 – 3	(England) Rotherham
	Stats

Headingley Rugby Stadium
Attendance: 785

21 September 2011
19:45

Nottingham (England)	33 – 29	(England) Doncaster
	Stats

Meadow Lane
Attendance: 682

12 October 2011
15:00

Rotherham (England)	17 – 22	(England) Nottingham
	Stats

Clifton Lane
Attendance: 337

12 October 2011
19:30

Doncaster (England)	24 – 22	(England) Leeds Carnegie
	Stats

Castle Park
Attendance: 710

11 November 2011
19:30

Ulster Ravens (Ireland)	39 – 7	(England) Doncaster
	Stats

Deramore Park

12 November 2011
15:00

Swansea (Wales)	6 – 13	(England) Rotherham
	Stats

St Helens
Attendance: 250

13 November 2011
15:00

Leeds Carnegie (England)	31 – 16	(Scotland) Currie
	Stats

Headingley Rugby Stadium
Attendance: 925

13 November 2011
15:00

Nottingham (England)	20 – 17	(Wales) Pontypridd
	Stats

Meadow Lane
Attendance: 1,349

18 November 2011
19:30

Currie (Scotland)	13 – 28	(Ireland) Ulster Ravens
	Stats

Malleny Park
Attendance: 652

19 November 2011
14:30

Pontypridd (Wales)	39 – 17	(Wales) Swansea
	Stats

Sardis Road
Attendance: 1,400

10 December 2011
14:30

Ulster Ravens (Ireland)	17 – 16	(Wales) Pontypridd
	Stats

Deramore Park

10 December 2011
15:00

Swansea (Wales)	21 – 38	(Scotland) Currie
	Stats

St Helens
Attendance: 150

17 December 2011
13:30

Rotherham (England)	24 – 31	(Ireland) Ulster Ravens
	Stats

Clifton Lane
Attendance: 581

17 December 2011
14:00

Doncaster (England)	16 – 20	(Wales) Swansea
	Stats

Castle Park
Attendance: 1,217

17 December 2011
14:30

Pontypridd (Wales)	18 – 7	(England) Leeds Carnegie
	Stats

Sardis Road
Attendance: 950

17 December 2011
15:00

Currie (Scotland)	16 – 23	(England) Nottingham
	Stats

Malleny Park
Attendance: 310

== Knock–out stages ==
=== Qualifiers ===
The six pool winners and the two best runners up proceeded to the knock out stages. The best four qualifiers (pool winners) had home advantage in the quarter finals.

Qualification	Team	Pld	W	D	L	PF	PA	PD	T	TB	LB	Pts
Pool 1 Winner	(England) Cornish Pirates	4	4	0	0	128	31	+97	17	2	0	18
Pool 6 Winner	(Ireland) Ulster Ravens	4	4	0	0	115	60	+55	14	2	0	18
Pool 3 Winner	(Ireland) Leinster A	4	3	1	0	117	75	+42	13	2	0	16
Pool 2 Winner	(Wales) Cross Keys	4	3	0	1	122	58	+64	15	3	0	15
Pool 4 Winner	(Wales) Llanelli	4	2	1	1	148	66	+82	16	2	1	13
Pool 5 Winner	(Wales) Pontypridd	4	2	0	2	90	61	+29	12	1	2	11
Pool 6 Runner-up	(England) Nottingham	4	4	0	0	98	79	+19	10	1	0	17
Pool 2 Runner-up	(Ireland) Munster A	4	3	0	1	67	22	+45	6	1	1	14

Quarter-finals
22 January 2012 – Donnybrook
(Ireland) Leinster A	32
(Wales) Pontypridd	0
20 January 2012 – Ravenhill
(Ireland) Ulster Ravens	9
(Ireland) Munster A	20
21 January 2012 – Pandy Park
(Wales) Cross Keys	32
(Wales) Llanelli	8
22 January 2012 – Mennaye Field
(England) Cornish Pirates	33
(England) Nottingham	3

Semi-finals
6 April 2012 – RDS
(Ireland) Leinster A	29
(Ireland) Munster A	36
7 April 2012 – Pandy Park
(Wales) Cross Keys	20
(England) Cornish Pirates	16

Final
27 April 2012 – Musgrave Park
(Ireland) Munster A	31
(Wales) Cross Keys	12

=== Quarter-finals ===
20 January 2012
19:30

Ulster Ravens (Ireland)	9 – 20	(Ireland) Munster A
Pen: Jackson (3) 8', 45', 60'	Report; Stats	Try: Scanlon 31' c Deasy 39' c Con: Deasy (2/2); Pen: Deasy (2) 2', 58'

Ravenhill
Referee: James Matthew (SRU)

21 January 2012
18:30

Cross Keys (Wales)	32 – 8	(Wales) Llanelli
Try: S Jones (2) 12' c, 21' c Hodge 45' m Trowbridge 53' c Con: S Jones (3); Pen: S Jones (2) 8', 53'	Report; Stats	Try: Evans 77' m Pen: Evans 36'

Pandy Park
Attendance: 228
Referee: Paul Haycock (IRFU)

22 January 2012
14:00

Cornish Pirates (England)	33 – 3	(England) Nottingham
Try: Maidment 17' c Short 21' c Ward 65' m Cooper 70' c Cook 79' c Con: Cook (4/5)	Report; Stats	Pen: Hallett 34'

Mennaye Field
Attendance: 1,492
Referee: Ian Davies (WRU)

22 January 2012
14:00

Leinster A (Ireland)	32 – 0	(Wales) Pontypridd
Try: Gilsenan 14' c Macken (2) 39' c, 53' c Hudson 72' m Con: Reid (3/3); Marsh (0/1); Pen: Reid (2) 2', 5'	Report; Stats

Donnybrook
Attendance: 780
Referee: Greg MacDonald (RFU)

=== Semi-finals ===
6 April 2012
18:00

Leinster A (Ireland)	29 – 36 (a.e.t.)	(Ireland) Munster A
Try: McGrath 45' c Ryan 49' c Con: Reid (2/2); Pen: Reid (5/9) 13', 33', 57', 61', 80+10'	Report; Stats	Try: O'Mahony 51' c O'Dea 54' c Kilcoyne 80+9' c Con: Deasy (3/3); Pen: Deasy (5/7) 8', 23', 38', 64', 80+7'

Royal Dublin Society
Attendance: 4,895
Referee: Ian Davies (WRU)

7 April 2012
15:00

Cross Keys (Wales)	20 – 16	(England) Cornish Pirates
Try: Baller (2) 5' c, 50' c Con: S. Jones (2/2); Pen: S. Jones (2) 3', 13'	Report; Stats	Try: Penalty try 35' c Con: Cook (1/1); Pen: Cook (3) 29', 44', 54'

Pandy Park
Attendance: 2,500
Referee: Cammy Rudkin (SRU)

=== Final ===
27 April 2012
17:30

Munster A (Ireland)	31 – 12	(Wales) Cross Keys
Try: Williams 26' c O'Dea 43' c Dineen 67' m Con: Deasy (2/3); Pen: Deasy (4/6) 3', 13', 25', 56'	Report; Stats	Pen: Tovey (4/6) 3', 6', 16', 36'

Musgrave Park
Attendance: 2,500
Referee: James Matthews (SRU)

== Top scorers ==
=== Top points scorers ===
Rank	Player	Team	Points
1	Noel Reid	(Ireland) Leinster A	80
2	Scott Deasy	(Ireland) Munster A	67
3	Alex Davies	(England) London Welsh	64
4	Jordan Williams	(Wales) Llanelli	58
5	Rob Cook	(England) Cornish Pirates	55
6	Steffan Jones	(Wales) Cross Keys	49
7	James Stokes	(England) Nottingham	46
8	Jamie Forbes	(Scotland) Currie	43
9	James McKinney	(Ireland) Ulster Ravens	35
10	Sam Davies	(Wales) Swansea	34

=== Top try scorers ===
Rank	Player	Team	Tries
1	Kristian Baller	(Wales) Cross Keys	6
2	Brendan Macken	(Ireland) Leinster A	5
3	Peter Nelson	(Ireland) Ulster Ravens	4
3	Matthew Nuthall	(Wales) Pontypridd	4
3	David Ward	(England) Cornish Pirates	4

== Geography ==
Team	Stadium	Capacity	City/Area/Country
(Wales) Aberavon	Talbot Athletic Ground	3,000	Port Talbot, Neath Port Talbot, Wales
(Scotland) Ayr	Millbrae	Unknown	Alloway, South Ayrshire, Scotland
(England) Bedford Blues	Goldington Road	5,000 (1,700 seats)	Bedford, Bedfordshire, England
(England) Bristol	Memorial Stadium	12,100	Bristol, England
(England) Cornish Pirates	Mennaye Field	3,500	Penzance, Cornwall, England
(Wales) Cross Keys	Pandy Park	Unknown	Crosskeys, Caerphilly County Borough, Wales
(Scotland) Currie	Malleny Park	Unknown	Balerno, Edinburgh, Scotland
(England) Doncaster	Castle Park	3,075	Doncaster, South Yorkshire, England
(England) Esher	Molesey Road	Unknown	Esher, England
(England) Leeds Carnegie	Headingley Stadium	21,062	Headingley, Leeds, England
(Ireland) Leinster A	Donnybrook	7,000	Dublin, Leinster, Ireland
(Wales) Llanelli	Parc y Scarlets	14,870	Llanelli, Carmarthenshire, Wales
(England) London Scottish	Richmond Athletic Ground	4,500 (1,000 seats)	Richmond, London, England
(England) London Welsh	Old Deer Park	5,850 (1,000 seats)	London, England
(Scotland) Melrose	The Greenyards	Unknown	Melrose, Scottish Borders, Scotland
(England) Moseley	Billesley Common	3,000+ (650 seated)	Birmingham, West Midlands, England
(Ireland) Munster A	Musgrave Park	8,300	Cork, County Cork, Ireland
(Wales) Neath	The Gnoll	7,500	Neath, Neath Port Talbot, Wales
(England) Nottingham	Meadow Lane	19,588	Nottingham, Nottinghamshire, England
(England) Plymouth Albion	The Brickfields	6,500	Plymouth, Devon, England
(Wales) Pontypridd	Sardis Road	7,861	Pontypridd, Rhondda Cynon Taf, Wales
(England) Rotherham	Clifton Lane	2,500	Rotherham, South Yorkshire, England
(Wales) Swansea	St Helens	4,500	Swansea, Wales
(Ireland) Ulster A	Ravenhill	12,125	Belfast, Ulster, Northern Ireland
