= 2013–14 British and Irish Cup =

Rugby union competition

Tournament details
- Countries: England; Ireland; Scotland; Wales
- Tournament format(s): Round-robin and knockout
- Date: 11 October 2013 – 23 May 2014

Tournament statistics
- Teams: 24
- Matches played: 79
- Attendance: 93,761 (1,187 per match)
- Tries scored: 477 (6.04 per match)
- Top point scorer(s): Cathal Marsh (Leinster A) (100 points)
- Top try scorer(s): Aaron Warren (Llanelli) (9 tries)

Final
- Venue: Donnybrook
- Attendance: 1,400
- Champions: (Ireland) Leinster A (2nd title)
- Runners-up: (England) Leeds Carnegie

The 2013–14 British and Irish Cup was the fifth season of the annual rugby union competition for second tier, semi-professional clubs from Britain and Ireland. Leinster A were the defending champions having won the 2012–13 Final with a 78th minute penalty by Noel Reid to beat Newcastle Falcons 18–17 at their home ground Kingston Park. There has been four different winners and four different losing finalists of the competition in the first four seasons of its existence.

The format of the competition has been changed once again, with Welsh participation being reduced to just four teams (down from 12 in the previous season). The Welsh teams were selected based on regional play-offs involving the 2013–14 Premier Division clubs at the start of the season. This process yielded Pontypridd to represent the Cardiff Blues Region, Cross Keys to represent the Dragons Region, Aberavon to represent the Ospreys Region, and Llanelli to represent the Scarlets Region.

Matches in the competition proper were played on the same weekends as the Heineken Cup and European Challenge Cup. First round matches began on 11 October 2013 and the final was held on 23 May 2014. Leinster A beat Leeds Carnegie 44 – 17 in the final and retained the cup they won in the previous season – the first team to win the cup for a second time.

== Teams ==
The allocation of teams was as follows:

- (England) – 12 clubs from RFU Championship
- (Ireland) – 4 Irish provinces represented by 'A' teams
- (Scotland) – 4 top clubs from the Scottish Premiership
- (Wales) – 4 clubs from the Welsh Premier Division

England	Ireland	Scotland	Wales
Bedford Blues Bristol Cornish Pirates Ealing Trailfinders Jersey (Note: Jersey is listed in the English section because they play in the English RFU Championship.) Leeds Carnegie London Scottish London Welsh Moseley Nottingham Plymouth Albion RotherhamTitans	Connacht Eagles Leinster A Munster A Ulster Ravens	Ayr Edinburgh Academicals Gala Stirling County	Aberavon Cross Keys Llanelli Pontypridd

=== Welsh qualification ===
Welsh participation was reduced from 12 teams (in the previous season) to just four. The Welsh teams were selected based on regional play-offs involving the 2013–14 Premier Division clubs at the start of the season. Teams gained home advantage depending upon their finishing position at the end of the 2012–13 season. For example, in the Cardiff Blues region, Cardiff RFC (8th in the 2012-13 Welsh Premier Division) traveled to Sardis Road to play Pontypridd RFC (1st). Likewise, Llanelli RFC (3rd) hosted Carmarthen Quins RFC (6th) with the winner (Llanelli) travelling to Llandovery RFC (2nd) to contest the right to represent the Scarlets region.

==== Cardiff Blues Region ====
7 September 2013
14:30

Pontypridd (1)	22 – 19	(8) Cardiff
	Pontypridd; Cardiff

Sardis Road, Pontypridd
Attendance: 1,500
Referee: Neil Hennessey (WRU)

- The winner of the Cardiff Blues Region, Pontypridd, will play in Pool 2.

==== Dragons Region ====
31 August 2013
14:30

Cross Keys (5)	39 – 17	(7) Newport
	Cross Keys; Newport

Pandy Park, Crosskeys
Referee: Leighton Hodges (WRU)

7 September 2013
14:30

Bedwas (4)	13 – 45	(5) Cross Keys
	Bedwas; Cross Keys

The Bridge Field, Bedwas
Referee: Gwyn Morris (WRU)

- The winner of the Dragons Region, Cross Keys, will play in Pool 1.

==== Ospreys Region ====
30 August 2013
19:30

Neath (10)	15 – 17	(11) Bridgend Ravens
	Neath; Bridgend

The Gnoll, Neath
Referee: Gwyn Morris (WRU)

31 August 2013
14:30

Aberavon (9)	15 – 8	(12) Swansea
	Aberavon; Swansea

Talbot Athletic Ground, Port Talbot
Attendance: 750
Referee: Neil Hennessy (WRU)

7 September 2013
14:30

Aberavon (9)	35 – 26	(11) Bridgend Ravens
	Aberavon; Bridgend Ravens

Talbot Athletic Ground, Port Talbot
Referee: Leighton Hodges (WRU)

- The winner of the Ospreys Region, Aberavon, will play in Pool 5.

==== Scarlets Region ====
1 September 2013
14:30

Llanelli (3)	16 – 15	(6) Carmarthen Quins
	Llanelli; Carmarthen

Parc y Scarlets, Llanelli
Referee: Nigel Owens (WRU)

7 September 2013
14:30

Llandovery (2)	20 – 26	(3) Llanelli
	Llandovery; Llanelli

Church Bank Playing Fields, Llandovery
Referee: Ian Davies (WRU)

- The winner of the Scarlets Region, Llanelli, will play in Pool 3.

== Competition format ==
The competition format is a pool stage followed by a knockout stage. The pool stage consists of six pools of four teams playing home and away matches. The top side in each pool, plus the two best runners-up, will progress to the knockout stage. The eight quarter-finalists will be ranked, with teams ranked 1-4 having home advantage. The four winning quarter finalists will progress to the semi-final draw. Matches will take place on the same weekends as the Heineken and Amlin Cups.

== Pool stages ==
The fixture weekends have been announced.

=== Pool 1 ===
Team	Pld	W	D	L	PF	PA	PD	TF	TA	TB	LB	Pts
(Ireland) Leinster A	6	6	0	0	171	70	+101	22	5	3	0	27
(Wales) Cross Keys	6	3	0	3	105	133	−28	13	19	2	0	14
(England) Moseley	6	2	0	4	128	115	+13	14	13	1	3	12
(England) Ealing Trailfinders	6	1	0	5	77	163	−86	9	21	0	1	5

Source: www.wru.co.uk
Rules for classification: 4 points for a win; 2 points for a draw; 1 bonus point for a loss by seven points or less; 1 bonus point for scoring four or more tries in a match

12 October 2013
14:30

(BP) Leinster A (Ireland)	49 – 8	(England) Ealing Trailfinders
	Leinster; Ealing

Donnybrook
Attendance: 1,077
Referee: Ben Whitehouse (WRU)

12 October 2013
15:00

Cross Keys (Wales)	20 – 16	(England) Moseley (BP)
	Cross Keys; Moseley

Pandy Park, Crosskeys
Attendance: 512
Referee: Stuart Gaffkin (IRFU)

19 October 2013
15:00

Ealing Trailfinders (England)	15 – 24	(Wales) Cross Keys (BP)
	Ealing; Cross Keys

Trailfinders Sports Ground
Attendance: 391
Referee: Sean Gallagher (IRFU)

19 October 2013
15:00

(BP) Moseley (England)	22 – 24	(Ireland) Leinster A
	Moseley; Leinster

Billesley Common
Attendance: 626
Referee: Claudio Bessano (FIR)

6 December 2013
19:30

Moseley (England)	28 – 10	(England) Ealing Trailfinders
	Moseley; Ealing

Billesley Common
Attendance: 704
Referee: Craig Evans (WRU)

7 December 2013
14:30

(BP) Leinster A (Ireland)	31 – 0	(Wales) Cross Keys
	Leinster; Cross Keys

Donnybrook
Attendance: 1,250
Referee: Tom Foley (IRFU)

13 December 2013
19:45

Ealing Trailfinders (England)	21 – 18	(England) Moseley (BP)
	Ealing; Moseley

Trailfinders Sports Ground
Attendance: 496
Referee: Greg MacDonald (RFU)

14 December 2013
15:00

Cross Keys (Wales)	14 – 30	(Ireland) Leinster A (BP)
	Cross Keys; Leinster

Pandy Park, Crosskeys
Attendance: 327
Referee: Simon Harding (RFU)

10 January 2014
18:00

Leinster A (Ireland)	23 – 13	(England) Moseley
	Leinster; Moseley

Donnybrook
Attendance: 1,000
Referee: Daniel Jones (WRU)

- This win secured Leinster's qualification to the knock out stages.

11 January 2014
15:00

(BP) Cross Keys (Wales)	30 – 10	(England) Ealing Trailfinders
	Cross Keys; Ealing

Pandy Park, Crosskeys
Attendance: 300
Referee: Matthew O'Grady (RFU)

17 January 2014
19:45

(BP) Ealing Trailfinders (England)	13 – 14	(Ireland) Leinster A
	Ealing; Leinster

Trailfinders Sports Ground
Attendance: 598
Referee: Craig Evans (WRU)

18 January 2014
14:00

(BP) Moseley (England)	31 – 17	(Wales) Cross Keys
	Moseley; Cross Keys

Billesley Common
Attendance: 528
Referee: Mark Connelly (IRFU)

=== Pool 2 ===
Team	Pld	W	D	L	PF	PA	PD	TF	TA	TB	LB	Pts
(Wales) Pontypridd	6	4	0	2	196	107	+89	27	13	3	2	21
(England) London Scottish	6	4	0	2	183	120	+63	21	13	3	2	21
(England) London Welsh	6	4	0	2	201	119	+82	24	11	2	2	20
(Scotland) Edinburgh Academicals	6	0	0	6	55	289	−234	7	42	0	0	0

Source: www.wru.co.uk
Rules for classification: 4 points for a win; 2 points for a draw; 1 bonus point for a loss by seven points or less; 1 bonus point for scoring four or more tries in a match

12 October 2013
14:30

(BP) London Welsh (England)	26 – 32	(England) London Scottish
	Welsh; Scottish

Monks Lane, Newbury
Attendance: 812
Referee: Sean Gallagher (IRFU)

12 October 2013
15:00

Edinburgh Academicals (Scotland)	13 – 53	(Wales) Pontypridd (BP)
	Edinburgh; Pontypridd

Raeburn Place
Attendance: 1,800
Referee: Steve Lee (RFU)

19 October 2013
14:30

(BP) Pontypridd (Wales)	29 – 22	(England) London Welsh (BP)
	Pontypridd; Welsh

Sardis Road, Pontypridd
Attendance: 3,400
Referee: Kieran Barry (IRFU)

19 October 2013
15:00

(BP) London Scottish (England)	55 – 19	(Scotland) Edinburgh Academicals
	Scottish; Edinburgh

Richmond Athletic Ground
Attendance: 1,272
Referee: David Jones (WRU)

7 December 2013
14:00

(BP) London Welsh (England)	73 – 10	(Scotland) Edinburgh Academicals
	Welsh; Edinburgh

Old Deer Park
Attendance: 971
Referee: Ben Whitehouse (WRU)

7 December 2013
14:30

Pontypridd (Wales)	27 – 20	(England) London Scottish (BP)
	Pontypridd; Scottish

Sardis Road, Pontypridd
Attendance: 1,300
Referee: Sean Gallagher (IRFU)

14 December 2013
14:00

Edinburgh Academicals (Scotland)	7 – 33	(England) London Welsh (BP)
	Edinburgh; Welsh

Raeburn Place
Attendance: 501
Referee: Stuart Gaffikin (IRFU)

14 December 2013
15:00

(BP) London Scottish (England)	26 – 21	(Wales) Pontypridd (BP)
	Scottish; Pontypridd

Richmond Athletic Ground
Attendance: 1,238
Referee: Ross Campbell (RFU)

11 January 2014
14:00

Edinburgh Academicals (Scotland)	6 – 32	(England) London Scottish (BP)
	Edinburgh; Scottish

Raeburn Place
Attendance: 475
Referee: Nigel Correll (IRFU)

11 January 2014
14:00

London Welsh (England)	26 – 23	(Wales) Pontypridd (BP)
	Welsh; Pontypridd

Kassam Stadium
Attendance: 1,348
Referee: Lloyd Linton (SRU)

18 January 2014
14:00

(BP) London Scottish (England)	18 – 21	(England) London Welsh
	Scottish; Welsh

Richmond Athletic Ground
Attendance: 2,485
Referee: Gary Conway (IRFU)

18 January 2014
14:00

(BP) Pontypridd (Wales)	43 – 0	(Scotland) Edinburgh Academicals
	Pontypridd

Sardis Road, Pontypridd
Attendance: 2,150
Referee: Andrew Jackson (RFU)

=== Pool 3 ===
Team	Pld	W	D	L	PF	PA	PD	TF	TA	TB	LB	Pts
(England) Rotherham Titans	6	5	0	1	168	96	+72	20	9	2	1	23
(Wales) Llanelli	6	2	0	4	185	110	+75	23	12	2	4	14
(England) Bedford Blues	6	2	0	4	137	141	−4	20	18	3	1	12
(Ireland) Connacht Eagles	6	3	0	3	85	228	−143	8	32	0	0	12

Source: www.wru.co.uk
Rules for classification: 4 points for a win; 2 points for a draw; 1 bonus point for a loss by seven points or less; 1 bonus point for scoring four or more tries in a match

12 October 2013
14:00

(BP) Llanelli (Wales)	76 – 14	(Ireland) Connacht Eagles
	Llanelli; Connacht

Parc y Scarlets, Llanelli
Attendance: 300
Referee: Craig Maxwell-Keys (RFU)

12 October 2013
15:00

Rotherham Titans (England)	12 – 11	(England) Bedford Blues (BP)
	Rotherham; Bedford

Clifton Lane
Attendance: 875
Referee: Craig Evans (WRU)

19 October 2013
14:30

Connacht Eagles (Ireland)	27 – 25	(England) Rotherham Titans (BP)
	Connacht; Rotherham

Sportsgrounds
Attendance: 468
Referee: Andrew Jackson (RFU)

19 October 2013
15:00

(BP) Bedford Blues (England)	29 – 24	(Wales) Llanelli (BP)
	Bedford; Llanelli

Goldington Road
Attendance: 2,603
Referee: Gary Conway (IRFU)

7 December 2013
14:00

(BP) Llanelli (Wales)	16 – 20	(England) Rotherham Titans
	Llanelli; Rotherham

Parc y Scarlets, Llanelli
Attendance: 875
Referee: Kieran Barry (IRFU)

7 December 2013
14:30

Connacht Eagles (Ireland)	17 – 8	(England) Bedford Blues
	Connacht; Bedford

Sportsgrounds
Attendance: 150
Referee: Graeme Wells (SRU)

14 December 2013
14:00

(BP) Bedford Blues (England)	50 – 12	(Ireland) Connacht Eagles
	Bedford; Connacht

Goldington Road
Attendance: 1,767
Referee: Daniel Jones (WRU)

14 December 2013
14:00

Rotherham Titans (England)	20 – 15	(Wales) Llanelli (BP)
	Rotherham; Llanelli

Clifton Lane
Attendance: 935
Referee: Lloyd Linton (SRU)

11 January 2014
14:00

(BP) Rotherham Titans (England)	59 – 3	(Ireland) Connacht Eagles
	Rotherham; Connacht

Clifton Lane
Attendance: 1,102
Referee: Craig Evans (WRU)

- Rotherham qualified for the knockout stages with this win as their nearest rivals, Llanelli, cannot overtake them.

11 January 2014
15:00

(BP) Llanelli (Wales)	44 – 15	(England) Bedford Blues
	Llanelli; Bedford

Parc y Scarlets, Llanelli
Attendance: 400
Referee: Sean Gallagher (IRFU)

18 January 2014
14:00

(BP) Bedford Blues (England)	24 – 32	(England) Rotherham Titans (BP)
	Bedford; Rotherham

Goldington Road
Attendance: 1,944
Referee: Ben Whitehouse (WRU)

18 January 2014
14:00

Connacht Eagles (Ireland)	12 – 10	(Wales) Llanelli (BP)
	Connacht; Llanelli

Sportsgrounds
Attendance: 100
Referee: Matthew O'Grady (RFU)

=== Pool 4 ===
Team	Pld	W	D	L	PF	PA	PD	TF	TA	TB	LB	Pts
(England) Plymouth Albion	6	5	0	1	165	77	+88	21	7	3	0	23
(Ireland) Munster A	6	5	0	1	147	70	+77	20	5	3	0	23
(England) Nottingham	6	2	0	4	137	130	+7	13	16	1	1	10
(Scotland) Stirling County	6	0	0	6	49	221	−172	7	33	0	0	0

Source: www.wru.co.uk
Rules for classification: 4 points for a win; 2 points for a draw; 1 bonus point for a loss by seven points or less; 1 bonus point for scoring four or more tries in a match

11 October 2013
19:45

Plymouth Albion (England)	28 – 9	(England) Nottingham
	Plymouth; Nottingham

The Brickfields
Attendance: 967
Referee: Nigel Correll (IRFU)

12 October 2013
17:00

(BP) Munster A (Ireland)	39 – 8	(Scotland) Stirling County
	Munster; Stirling

Bandon RFC
Referee: Andrew Jackson (RFU)

18 October 2013
20:00

(BP) Nottingham (England)	16 – 17	(Ireland) Munster A
	Nottingham; Munster

Meadow Lane
Attendance: 1,532
Referee: Simon Rees (WRU)

19 October 2013
15:00

Stirling County (Scotland)	12 – 38	(England) Plymouth Albion (BP)
	Stirling; Plymouth

Bridgehaugh
Attendance: 625
Referee: Craig Evans (WRU)

6 December 2013
19:45

Plymouth Albion (England)	17 – 7	(Ireland) Munster A
	Plymouth; Munster

The Brickfields
Attendance: 1,473
Referee: James McPhail (SRU)

7 December 2013
15:00

Stirling County (Scotland)	7 – 50	(England) Nottingham (BP)
	Stirling; Nottingham

Bridgehaugh
Attendance: 600
Referee: Daniel Jones (WRU)

13 December 2013
19:30

Munster A (Ireland)	23 – 9	(England) Plymouth Albion
	Munster; Plymouth

Waterford Regional Sports Centre
Attendance: 420
Referee: Craig Evans (WRU)

13 December 2013
20:00

Nottingham (England)	24 – 14	(Scotland) Stirling County
	Nottingham; Stirling

Meadow Lane
Attendance: 967
Referee: Nigel Correll (IRFU)

10 January 2014
19:30

(BP) Munster A (Ireland)	30 – 15	(England) Nottingham
	Munster; Nottingham

St Mary's RFC, Limerick
Attendance: 1,250
Referee: Vlad Iordachescu (RRF)

10 January 2014
19:45

(BP) Plymouth Albion (England)	39 – 3	(Scotland) Stirling County
	Plymouth; Stirling

The Brickfields
Attendance: 1,125
Referee: Stuart Gaffiken (IRFU)

18 January 2014
13:00

Nottingham (England)	23 – 34	(England) Plymouth Albion (BP)
	Nottingham; Plymouth

Meadow Lane
Attendance: 670
Referee: John Meredith (RFU)

18 January 2014
14:00

Stirling County (Scotland)	5 – 31	(Ireland) Munster A (BP)
	Stirling; Munster

Bridgehaugh
Attendance: 650
Referee: Fergus Kirby (RFU)

=== Pool 5 ===
Team	Pld	W	D	L	PF	PA	PD	TF	TA	TB	LB	Pts
(England) Leeds Carnegie	6	5	0	1	269	77	+192	40	11	4	1	25
(England) Bristol	6	5	0	1	261	62	+199	41	6	3	1	24
(Wales) Aberavon	6	2	0	4	72	281	−209	8	42	0	0	8
(Scotland) Gala	6	0	0	6	54	236	−182	5	35	0	1	1

Source: https://web.archive.org/web/20131017003053/http://www.wru.co.uk/eng/club/britishandirishcup/tables.php www.wru.co.uk]
Rules for classification: 4 points for a win; 2 points for a draw; 1 bonus point for a loss by seven points or less; 1 bonus point for scoring four or more tries in a match

12 October 2013
19:00

Gala (Scotland)	17 – 31	(Wales) Aberavon
	Gala; Aberavon

Netherdale
Attendance: 2,000
Referee: David Procter (RFU)

13 October 2013
15:00

Bristol (England)	21 – 17	(England) Leeds Carnegie (BP)
	Bristol; Leeds

Memorial Stadium
Attendance: 2,648
Referee: Maiteo Liperini (FIR)

19 October 2013
14:30

Aberavon (Wales)	P – P	(England) Bristol

Talbot Athletic Ground, Port Talbot

- This match was abandoned after 69 minutes when a large hole appeared in the pitch due to a collapsed drain. Bristol were leading 20 – 24 at this point. The match was ordered to be replayed at Talbot Athletic Ground before the conclusion of the pool stages on a date suitable to both clubs.

20 October 2013
14:30

Leeds Carnegie (England)	86 – 8	(Scotland) Gala
	Leeds; Gala

Clifton Park, York RUFC
Attendance: 1,037
Referee: Steve Lee (RFU)

7 December 2013
14:30

Aberavon (Wales)	22 – 41	(England) Leeds Carnegie (BP)
	Aberavon; Leeds

Talbot Athletic Ground, Port Talbot
Attendance: 900
Referee: Simon Harding (RFU)

8 December 2013
14:00

(BP) Bristol (England)	62 – 7	(Scotland) Gala
	Bristol; Gala

Memorial Stadium
Attendance: 2,201
Referee: Gary Conway (IRFU)

10 December 2013
19:30

Aberavon (Wales)	0 – 78	(England) Bristol (BP)
	Aberavon; Bristol

Talbot Athletic Ground, Port Talbot
Attendance: 250
Referee: Wayne Davies (WRU)

14 December 2013
14:00

(BP) Leeds Carnegie (England)	72 – 0	(Wales) Aberavon
	Leeds; Aberavon

Brantingham Park, Hull Ionians RUFC
Attendance: 471
Referee: Eddie Hogan-O’Connell (IRFU)

14 December 2013
15:00

Gala (Scotland)	6 – 17	(England) Bristol
	Gala; Bristol

Netherdale
Attendance: 397
Referee: Ben Whitehouse (WRU)

11 January 2014
15:00

Gala (Scotland)	7 – 29	(England) Leeds Carnegie (BP)
	Gala; Leeds

Netherdale
Attendance: 546
Referee: Andrew Brace (IRFU)

12 January 2014
15:00

(BP) Bristol (England)	64 – 8	(Wales) Aberavon
	Bristol; Aberavon

Memorial Stadium
Attendance: 3,044
Referee: Andrew Jackson (RFU)

18 January 2014
14:00

Aberavon (Wales)	11 – 9	(Scotland) Gala (BP)
	Aberavon; Gala

Talbot Athletic Ground, Port Talbot
Attendance: 650
Referee: David Procter (RFU)

18 January 2014
14:00

Leeds Carnegie (England)	24 – 19	(England) Bristol (BP)
	Leeds; Bristol

Headingley
Attendance: 1,013
Referee: Kieran Barry (IRFU)

=== Pool 6 ===
Team	Pld	W	D	L	PF	PA	PD	TF	TA	TB	LB	Pts
(England) Cornish Pirates	6	5	0	1	193	95	+98	25	9	4	1	25
(Ireland) Ulster Ravens	6	3	0	3	147	175	−28	18	22	1	0	13
Jersey	6	2	0	4	117	128	−11	14	16	2	2	12
(Scotland) Ayr	6	2	0	4	123	182	−59	15	25	1	1	10

Source: www.wru.co.uk
Rules for classification: 4 points for a win; 2 points for a draw; 1 bonus point for a loss by seven points or less; 1 bonus point for scoring four or more tries in a match

11 October 2013
19:45

(BP) Cornish Pirates (England)	34 – 17	(Ireland) Ulster Ravens
	Pirates; Ulster

Mennaye Field
Attendance: 1,326
Referee: Tom Foley (RFU)

12 October 2013
15:00

(BP) Jersey	28 – 16	(Scotland) Ayr
	Jersey; Ayr

St. Peter
Attendance: 1,854
Referee: Daniel Jones (WRU)

18 October 2013
19:30

Ulster Ravens (Ireland)	24 – 19	Jersey (BP)
	Ulster; Jersey

Ravenhill
Attendance: 1,755
Referee: Simon Harding (RFU)

19 October 2013
15:00

Ayr (Scotland)	10 – 53	(England) Cornish Pirates (BP)
	Ayr; Pirates

Millbrae
Attendance: 550
Referee: Craig Maxwell-Keys (RFU)

7 December 2013
14:30

(BP) Ayr (Scotland)	41 – 22	(Ireland) Ulster Ravens
	Ayr; Ulster

Millbrae
Attendance: 450
Referee: Andrew Jackson (RFU)

7 December 2013
19:00

(BP) Cornish Pirates (England)	31 – 20	Jersey
	Pirates; Jersey

Mennaye Field
Attendance: 1,223
Referee: Dean Richards (RFU)

13 December 2013
19:30

(BP) Ulster Ravens (Ireland)	38 – 21	(Scotland) Ayr
	Ulster

Deramore Park, Belfast Harlequins
Attendance: 400
Referee: David Procter (RFU)

14 December 2013
15:00

Jersey	0 – 24	(England) Cornish Pirates (BP)
	Jersey; Pirates

St. Peter
Attendance: 1,638
Referee: Andrew Jackson (RFU)

- Cornish Pirates qualified for the knockout stages after this win.

11 January 2014
15:00

(BP) Jersey	37 – 19	(Ireland) Ulster Ravens
	Jersey; Ulster

St. Peter
Attendance: 1,628
Referee: Craig Maxwell-Keys (RFU)

12 January 2014
15:00

Cornish Pirates (England)	28 – 21	(Scotland) Ayr (BP)
	Pirates

Mennaye Field
Attendance: 1,027
Referee: David Proctor (RFU)

17 January 2014
19:30

Ulster Ravens (Ireland)	27 – 23	(England) Cornish Pirates (BP)
	Ulster; Pirates

Deramore Park, Belfast Harlequins
Attendance: 500
Referee: Lloyd Linton (SRU)

18 January 2014
14:00

Ayr (Scotland)	14 – 13	Jersey (BP)
	Ayr; Jersey

Millbrae
Attendance: 580
Referee: James McPhail (SRU)

== Knock-out stages ==
=== Qualifiers ===
The six pool winners, and the two best runners-up, proceed to the knock out stages. The ranking criteria of the quarter finalists has been altered slightly from earlier seasons. Previously, the six pool winners were seeded 1-6 and the two runners up as 7 and 8. This meant that the best runners-up were automatically ranked 7 and 8 even if they had a better playing record than some of the teams ranked 1–6. This is no longer the case.

There was a draw for the quarter-final stage, which took place on 27 January 2014. The top four seeds (Leinster A, Leeds Carnegie, Cornish Pirates and Bristol) will have home advantage.

Teams are ranked by

1. Competition Points (4 for a win, 2 for a draw, etc.)
2. where Competition Points are equal, greatest number of wins
3. where the number of wins are equal, aggregate points difference
4. where the aggregate points difference are equal, greatest number of points scored

There are further criteria that can be applied if necessary.

Qualification	Team	Pld	W	D	L	PF	PA	PD	TF	TA	TB	LB	Pts
Pool 1 winner	(Ireland) Leinster A	6	6	0	0	171	70	+101	22	5	3	0	27
Pool 5 winner	(England) Leeds Carnegie	6	5	0	1	269	77	+192	40	11	4	1	25
Pool 6 winner	(England) Cornish Pirates	6	5	0	1	193	95	+98	25	9	4	1	25
Pool 5 runner-up	(England) Bristol	6	5	0	1	261	62	+199	41	6	3	1	24
Pool 4 winner	(England) Plymouth Albion	6	5	0	1	165	77	+88	21	7	3	0	23
Pool 4 runner-up	(Ireland) Munster A	6	5	0	1	147	70	+77	20	5	3	0	23
Pool 3 winner	(England) Rotherham Titans	6	5	0	1	168	96	+72	20	9	2	1	23
Pool 2 winner	(Wales) Pontypridd	6	4	0	2	196	107	+89	27	13	3	2	21

Quarter-finals
5 April 2014 – Mennaye Field
(England) Cornish Pirates	14
(Wales) Pontypridd	16
4 April 2014 – Donnybrook
(Ireland) Leinster A	47
(Ireland) Munster A	15
4 April 2014 – Memorial Stadium
(England) Bristol	39
(England) Rotherham Titans	24
4 April 2014 – Headingley
(England) Leeds Carnegie	41
(England) Plymouth Albion	21

Semi-finals
26 April 2014 - Sardis Road (Note: Leinster won on number of tries scored.)
(Wales) Pontypridd	22
(Ireland) Leinster A	22
4 May 2014 – Memorial Stadium
(England) Bristol	25
(England) Leeds Carnegie	30

Final
23 May 2014 – Donnybrook
(Ireland) Leinster A	44
(England) Leeds Carnegie	17

=== Quarter-finals ===
The draw for the quarter-finals was carried out on 27 January 2014.

4 April 2014
19:00

Leinster A (Ireland)	47 – 15	(Ireland) Munster A
	Leinster; Munster

Donnybrook
Attendance: 1,500
Referee: Craig Maxwell-Keyes (RFU)

4 April 2014
19:45

Bristol (England)	39 – 24	(England) Rotherham Titans
	Bristol; Rotherham

Memorial Stadium
Attendance: 3,118
Referee: Craig Evans (WRU)

4 April 2014
20:00

Leeds Carnegie (England)	41 – 21	(England) Plymouth Albion
	Leeds; Plymouth

Headingley
Attendance: 575
Referee: Lloyd Linton (SRU)

5 April 2014
14:30

Cornish Pirates (England)	14–16	(Wales) Pontypridd
	Pirates; Pontypridd

Mennaye Field
Attendance: 2,155
Referee: Gary Conway (IRFU)

=== Semi-finals ===
The draw for the semi-finals was carried out on 27 January 2014.

26 April 2014
14:30

Pontypridd (Wales)	22 – 22	(Ireland) Leinster A
	Pontypridd; Leinster

Sardis Road
Attendance: 5,200
Referee: Craig Maxwell-Keys (RFU)

- Leinster won on tries scored.

4 May 2014
15:00

Bristol (England)	25 – 30	(England) Leeds Carnegie
	Bristol; Leeds

Memorial Stadium
Attendance: 3,832
Referee: Gary Conway (IRFU)

=== Final ===
On 14 April, it was announced that the final will be played at the home of the winner of the Pontypridd / Leinster A semi-final. This will be played on Friday 23 May, at a time to be decided.

23 May 2014
19:00

Leinster A (Ireland)	44 – 17	(England) Leeds Carnegie
	Leinster; Leeds

Donnybrook
Attendance: 2,024
Referee: Ben Whitehouse (WRU)

== Top scorers ==
=== Top points scorers ===
Rank	Player	Team	Points
1	Cathal Marsh	Leinster A	119
2	Simon Humberstone	Pontypridd	92
3	Glyn Hughes	Leeds Carnegie	63
4	James McKinney	Ulster Ravens	62
5	Matthew Jarvis	Nottingham	58
5	Will Robinson	London Welsh	58
7	Aaron Warren	Llanelli	45
8	Adrian Jarvis	Bristol	44
8	Finn Russell	Ayr	44
10	Johnny Holland	Munster A	41

=== Top try scorers ===
Rank	Player	Team	Tries
1	Aaron Warren	Llanelli	9
2	Andy Short	Bristol	7
3	David Doherty	Leeds Carnegie	6
3	Ronan O'Mahony	Munster A	6
5	Mark Bright	London Scottish	5
5	Iain Grieve	Bristol	5
5	Josh Griffin	Leeds Carnegie	5
8	Charlie Amesbury	Bristol	4
8	Aaron Carpenter	Cornish Pirates	4
8	Matt Evans	Cornish Pirates	4
8	Auguy Slowik	Bristol	4

== Geography ==
Team	Stadium	Capacity	City/Area/Country
(Wales) Aberavon	Talbot Athletic Ground	3,000	Port Talbot, Neath Port Talbot, Wales
(Scotland) Ayr	Millbrae	Unknown	Alloway, South Ayrshire, Scotland
(England) Bedford Blues	Goldington Road	5,000 (1,700 seats)	Bedford, Bedfordshire, England
(England) Bristol	Memorial Stadium	12,100	Horfield, Bristol, England
(Ireland) Connacht Eagles	Sportsgrounds	9,500	Galway, Connacht, Ireland
(England) Cornish Pirates	Mennaye Field	4,000	Penzance, Cornwall, England
(Wales) Cross Keys	Pandy Park	Unknown	Crosskeys, Caerphilly County Borough, Wales
(England) Ealing Trailfinders	Trailfinders Sports Ground	Unknown	West Ealing, London, England
(Scotland) Edinburgh Academicals	Raeburn Place	5,000	Stockbridge, Edinburgh, Scotland
(Scotland) Gala	Netherdale	6,000	Galashiels, Scottish Borders, Scotland
Jersey	St. Peter	5,000	Saint Peter, Jersey
(England) Leeds Carnegie	Headingley (Note: Leeds will play two of their British and Irish Cup pool matches "on the road": the match against Gala (Sunday 20 October) at York R.U.F.C.; the match against Aberavon (Saturday 14 December) at Hull Ionians R.U.F.C.)	21,062	Headingley, Leeds, England
(Ireland) Leinster A	Donnybrook	7,000	Dublin, Leinster, Ireland
(Wales) Llanelli	Parc y Scarlets	14,870	Llanelli, Carmarthenshire, Wales
(England) London Scottish	Richmond Athletic Ground	4,500 (1,000 seats)	Richmond, London, England
(England) London Welsh	Kassam Stadium (Note: London Welsh remained at Kassam Stadium, Oxford after demotion from the Premiership at the end of the 2012–13 season. They decided to play their British and Irish Cup pool match against London Scottish at Newbury's Monks Lane as an opportunity to build upon and extend our support base in the area. They also played their match against Edinburgh Academicals (7 December) at their traditional Old Deer Park home.)	12,500	Oxford, Oxfordshire, England
(England) Moseley	Billesley Common	3,650	Birmingham, West Midlands, England
(Ireland) Munster A	Musgrave Park (Note: Munster A will play their British and Irish Cup pool matches in various venues around the province: the match against Stirling County (Saturday 12 October) at Bandon RFC, County Cork; the match against Plymouth Albion (Friday 13 December) at Waterford Regional Sports Centre, Waterford; and the match against Nottingham (Friday 10 January) at St Mary's RFC, Limerick)	8,300	Cork, County Cork, Ireland
(England) Nottingham	Meadow Lane	19,588	Nottingham, Nottinghamshire, England
(England) Plymouth Albion	The Brickfields	6,500	Plymouth, Devon, England
(Wales) Pontypridd	Sardis Road	7,861	Pontypridd, Rhondda Cynon Taf, Wales
(England) Rotherham	Clifton Lane	2,500	Rotherham, South Yorkshire, England
(Scotland) Stirling County	Bridgehaugh	4,000	Stirling, Scotland
(Ireland) Ulster Ravens	Ravenhill (Note: Ulster Ravens will play some of their British and Irish Cup pool matches at Deramore Park, home of Belfast Harlequins.)	13,500	Belfast, Ulster, Northern Ireland
