= 2014–15 British and Irish Cup =

Tournament details
- Countries: England; Ireland; Wales
- Tournament format(s): Round-robin and knockout
- Date: 10 October 2014 — 3 April 2015

Tournament statistics
- Teams: 20
- Matches played: 67
- Attendance: 111,051 (1,657 per match)
- Highest attendance: 7,640; Bristol 50–34 Connacht Eagles (12 October 2014)
- Lowest attendance: 150; Ulster Ravens 25–12 Aberavon (13 December 2014)
- Top point scorer(s): Douglas Flockhart (Doncaster Knights); 89 points
- Top try scorer(s): Cian Kelleher (Leinster A); 9 tries

Final
- Venue: Castle Park, Doncaster
- Attendance: 3,115
- Champions: Worcester Warriors (1st title)
- Runners-up: Doncaster Knights

The 2014–15 British and Irish Cup is the sixth season of the annual rugby union competition for second tier, semi-professional clubs from Britain and Ireland. Leinster A are the defending champions having won the 2013–14 final against Yorkshire Carnegie 44–17 at Donnybrook on 23 May 2014. There has been four different winners and five different losing finalists of the competition in the five seasons of its existence.

The format of the competition has been changed once again, with the Scottish withdrawing from the competition because of an increase, from four to six, in the number of the group matches before Christmas. Scottish Rugby felt that Scottish teams would not be able to compete fully in both the British and Irish Cup and the Scottish Premiership, the top-flight league for clubs in Scotland. The Welsh teams selection is based on regional play-offs involving the 2013–14 Premier Division clubs at the start of the season. This process yielded Pontypridd to represent the Cardiff Blues Region, Cross Keys to represent the Dragons Region, Aberavon to represent the Ospreys Region, and Carmarthen Quins to represent the Scarlets Region.

Matches in the competition proper were played on the same weekends as the European Rugby Champions Cup and European Rugby Challenge Cup. First round matches began on 10 October 2014 and the final was held on 3 April 2015. Worcester Warriors beat Doncaster Knights 35 – 5 in the final held at Castle Park, Doncaster; the home ground of the Knights.

== Participating teams and locations ==
The allocation of teams is as follows:

- (England) – twelve clubs from RFU Championship
- (Ireland) – four Irish provinces represented by 'A' teams
- (Wales) – four clubs from the Welsh Premier Division
Locations of the 2014-15 British & Irish Cup teams

Club	Country	League	Stadium	Capacity	Area
Aberavon	Wales	Welsh Premier Division	Talbot Athletic Ground	3,000	Port Talbot
Bedford Blues	England	RFU Championship	Goldington Road	5,000 (1,700 seats)	Bedford
Bristol	England	RFU Championship	Ashton Gate Stadium	21,497	Bristol
Carmarthen Quins	Wales	Welsh Premier Division	Carmarthen Park; Parc y Scarlets	3,000; 14,870	Carmarthen; Llanelli
Connacht Eagles	Ireland	Inter-Provincial Championship	Galway Sportsgrounds	7,500	Galway
Cornish Pirates	England	RFU Championship	Mennaye Field	3,500	Penzance
Cross Keys	Wales	Welsh Premier Division	Pandy Park	3,000	Crosskeys
Doncaster Knights	England	RFU Championship	Castle Park rugby stadium	5,000	Doncaster
Jersey	(Jersey) England (Note: Jersey is listed in the English section because they play in the English RFU Championship.)	RFU Championship	St. Peter	5,000	Saint Peter
Leinster A	Ireland	Inter-Provincial Championship	Donnybrook Stadium	6,000	Dublin
London Scottish	England	RFU Championship	Richmond Athletic Ground	4,500 (1,000 seats)	London
Moseley	England	RFU Championship	Billesley Common	3,000+	Birmingham
Munster A	Ireland	Inter-Provincial Championship	Musgrave Park; Clonmel Rugby Club; Temple Hill	9,251 1,000	Cork; Clonmel; Cork
Nottingham Rugby	England	RFU Championship	Meadow Lane; Lady Bay Sports Ground	19,588; 2,000 (est)	Nottingham
Plymouth Albion	England	RFU Championship	The Brickfields	8,500	Plymouth
Pontypridd	Wales	Welsh Premier Division	Sardis Road	7,861	Pontypridd
Rotherham Titans	England	RFU Championship	Clifton Lane	2,500	Rotherham
Ulster Ravens	Ireland	Inter-Provincial Championship	Kingspan Stadium; Deramore Park	18,196; 1,000+	Belfast
Worcester Warriors	England	RFU Championship	Sixways Stadium	12,024	Worcester
Yorkshire Carnegie	England	RFU Championship	Headingley Rugby Stadium; Silver Royd; Brantingham Park; Laund Hill	20,250; 1,950; 1,500; 2,000	Leeds; Scalby; Brantingham; Huddersfield

=== Welsh qualification ===
The Welsh teams are selected, based on regional play-offs involving the twelve clubs from the 2013–14 Premier Division and played at the start of the season. Teams gained home advantage depending upon their finishing position at the end of last season.

==== Cardiff Blues Region ====
The two constituent clubs of the Cardiff Blues played in a one-off game to determine the region's representative in the Cup.

6 September 2014
14:30

Pontypridd	40 – 12	Cardiff
	Pontypridd; Cardiff

Sardis Road
Attendance: 2,000
Referee: Gary Conway (IRFU)

==== Dragons Region ====
The four teams that make up the Newport Gwent Dragons each played in semi-finals, with the winner of each progressing to play off for the opportunity to represent the region.

30 August 2014

Bedwas	25 – 41	Newport
	Bedwas; Newport

Bridge Field
Attendance: 300
Referee: Leighton Hodges (WRU)

30 August 2014
14:30

Cross Keys	16 – 13	Ebbw Vale
	Cross Keys; Ebbw Vale

Pandy Park
Attendance: 500
Referee: Neil Hennessy (WRU)

6 September 2014

Cross Keys	31 – 12	Newport
	Cross Keys; Newport

Pandy Park
Attendance: 300
Referee: Sean Brickell (WRU)

==== Ospreys Region ====
With three teams making up the Ospreys region, Aberavon and Neath faced each other first, with the winner going into the final play-off with Bridgend.

30 August 2014
15:00

Aberavon	25 – 10	Neath
	Aberavon; Neath

Talbot Athletic Ground
Attendance: 800

6 September 2014
14:30

Bridgend	19 – 20	Aberavon
	Bridgend; Aberavon

Brewery Field
Attendance: 620
Referee: Neil Hennessy (WRU)

==== Scarlets Region ====
Like the Ospreys, the Scarlets region has three constituent clubs, so two teams played each other in a preliminary game for the chance to face the third team in the deciding match.

30 August 2014

Llandovery	28 – 15	Llanelli
	Llandovery; Llanelli

Church Bank
Attendance: 600
Referee: Rhys Thomas (WRU)

6 September 2014

Carmarthen Quins	37 – 13	Llandovery
	Carmarthen; Llandovery

Carmarthen Park
Attendance: 300
Referee: Rhys Thomas (WRU)

== Competition format ==
The competition format is a pool stage followed by a knockout stage. The pool stage consists of five pools of four teams playing home and away matches. The top side in each pool, plus the three best runners-up, will progress to the knockout stage. The eight quarter-finalists will be ranked, with teams ranked 1-4 having home advantage. The four winning quarter-finalists will progress to the semi-final draw. Matches will take place on the same weekends as the European Rugby Champions Cup and European Rugby Challenge Cup cups.

== Pool stages ==
=== Pool 1 ===
Team	Pld	W	D	L	PF	PA	PD	TB	LB	Pts
(England) Bristol	6	6	0	0	181	119	+62	3	0	27
(Wales) Pontypridd	6	4	0	2	158	115	+43	2	1	19
(England) London Scottish	6	1	0	5	110	129	−19	0	3	7
(Ireland) Connacht Eagles	6	1	0	5	111	197	−86	1	0	5

Source: BBC
Rules for classification: 4 points for a win; 2 points for a draw; 1 bonus point for a loss by seven points or less; 1 bonus point for scoring four or more tries in a match

11 October 2014
14:30

Pontypridd	23 – 17	London Scottish (BP)
	Pontypridd; Scottish

Sardis Road
Attendance: 2,600
Referee: Mark Connelly

12 October 2014
15:00

(BP) Bristol	50 – 34	Connacht Eagles (BP)
	Bristol; Connacht

Ashton Gate
Attendance: 7,640
Referee: Ben Whitehouse (WRU)

18 October 2014
15:00

(BP) London Scottish	18 – 22	Bristol
	Scottish; Bristol

Athletic Ground
Attendance: 1,608
Referee: Sean Gallagher (IRFU)

19 October 2014
14:00

Connacht Eagles	16 – 42	Pontypridd (BP)
	Connacht; Pontypridd

Galway Sportsgrounds
Referee: John Carville

25 October 2014
14:30

Connacht Eagles	30 – 27	London Scottish (BP)
	Connacht; Scottish

Galway Sportsgrounds
Attendance: 250
Referee: Craig Evans (WRU)

25 October 2014
14:30

Pontypridd	13 – 24	Bristol
	Pontypridd; Bristol

Sardis Road
Attendance: 5,800
Referee: Nigel Correll

29 November 2014
15:00

London Scottish	17 – 7	Connacht Eagles
	Report

Richmond Athletic Ground
Attendance: 1,296
Referee: Andrew Jackson

30 November 2014
15:00

(BP) Bristol	31 – 26	Pontypridd (BP)
	Report

Ashton Gate
Attendance: 5,760
Referee: Andrew Brace

5 December 2014
19:45

Bristol	25 – 14	London Scottish

Ashton Gate
Attendance: 4,608
Referee: Darren Gamage

6 December 2014
14:30

(BP) Pontypridd	29 – 10	Connacht Eagles
	Report

Sardis Road
Attendance: 1,500
Referee: Fergus Kirby

13 December 2014
14:00

Connacht Eagles	14 – 32	Bristol (BP)
	Report

Galway Sportsgrounds
Attendance: 209
Referee: Craig Evans

13 December 2014
14:00

London Scottish	17 – 25	Pontypridd

Richmond Athletic Ground
Attendance: 1,640
Referee: Sean Gallagher

=== Pool 2 ===
Team	Pld	W	D	L	PF	PA	PD	TB	LB	Pts
(England) Rotherham Titans	6	5	0	1	204	104	+100	4	1	25
(England) Yorkshire Carnegie	6	5	0	1	208	110	+98	4	0	24
(Ireland) Ulster Ravens	6	1	0	5	121	162	−41	1	3	8
(Wales) Aberavon	6	1	0	5	89	246	−157	1	0	5

Source: BBC
Rules for classification: 4 points for a win; 2 points for a draw; 1 bonus point for a loss by seven points or less; 1 bonus point for scoring four or more tries in a match

10 October 2014
20:00

Yorkshire Carnegie	3 – 20	Rotherham Titans
	Carnegie; Rotherham

Silver Royd, Scalby
Attendance: 864
Referee: Jamie Leahy (RFU)

11 October 2014
15:00

Aberavon	18 – 14	Ulster Ravens (BP)
	Aberavon; Ulster

Talbot Athletic Ground
Attendance: 830
Referee: Matthew O'Grady (RFU)

18 October 2014
14:00

(BP) Ulster Ravens	17 – 22	Yorkshire Carnegie
	Ulster; Carnegie

Kingspan Stadium
Attendance: 600
Referee: Craig Evans (IRFU)

18 October 2014
15:00

(BP) Rotherham Titans	37 – 13	Aberavon
	Rotherham; Aberavon

Clifton Lane
Attendance: 827
Referee: Andrew Brace (IRFU)

24 October 2014
19:00

(2BP) Ulster Ravens	29 – 31	Rotherham Titans (BP)
	Ulster; Rotherham

Deramore Park
Attendance: 500
Referee: Ben Whitehouse

25 October 2014
14:30

(BP) Yorkshire Carnegie	85 – 0	Aberavon
	Carnegie; Aberavon

Brantingham Park, Brantingham
Attendance: 482
Referee: Sean Gallagher (IRFU)

28 November 2014
19:15

(BP) Aberavon	32 – 43	Yorkshire Carnegie (BP)

Talbot Athletic Ground
Attendance: 450
Referee: Eddie Hogan O'Connol

29 November 2014
14:00

(BP) Rotherham Titans	52 – 17	Ulster Ravens

Clifton Lane
Attendance: 1,000
Referee: Craig Evans

6 December 2014
14:30

Aberavon	14 – 42	Rotherham Titans (BP)

Talbot Athletic Ground
Attendance: 250
Referee: Matt O'Grady

7 December 2014
14:30

(BP) Yorkshire Carnegie	27 – 19	Ulster Ravens
	Report

Laund Hill, Huddersfield
Attendance: 650

13 December 2014
14:00

(BP) Rotherham Titans	22 – 28	Yorkshire Carnegie (BP)

Clifton Lane
Attendance: 1,087
Referee: David Proctor

13 December 2014
14:00

Ulster Ravens	25 – 12	Aberavon

Delamore Park
Attendance: 150
Referee: Fergus Kilby

=== Pool 3 ===
Team	Pld	W	D	L	PF	PA	PD	TB	LB	Pts
(England) Worcester Warriors	6	6	0	0	189	94	+95	3	0	27
(Ireland) Munster A	6	4	0	2	149	112	+37	1	2	19
(England) Moseley	6	2	0	4	95	172	−77	1	1	10
(England) Nottingham	6	0	0	6	109	164	−55	1	3	4

Source: BBC
Rules for classification: 4 points for a win; 2 points for a draw; 1 bonus point for a loss by seven points or less; 1 bonus point for scoring four or more tries in a match

11 October 2014
15:00

Munster A	27 – 21	Moseley (BP)
	Munster

Clonmel Rugby Club, Clonmel
Attendance: 550
Referee: Craig Evans

11 October 2014
15:00

(BP) Nottingham	19 – 26	Worcester Warriors
	Nottingham; Worcester

Meadow Lane
Attendance: 756
Referee: John Meredith

18 October 2014
15:00

Moseley	22 – 14	Nottingham
	Moseley; Nottingham

Billesley Common
Attendance: 250
Referee: David Procter (RFU)

18 October 2014
15:00

Worcester Warriors	27 – 23	Munster A (BP)
	Worcester; Munster

Sixways Stadium
Attendance: 6,916
Referee: Ben Whitehouse (WRU)

24 October 2014
20:00

Nottingham	12 – 23	Munster A
	Nottingham; Munster

Meadow Lane
Attendance: 1,119
Referee: Rhys Thomas (WRU)

25 October 2014
15:00

Moseley	0 – 39	Worcester Warriors (BP)
	Worcester

Billesley Common
Attendance: 1,483
Referee: Matthew O'Grady

29 November 2014
15:00

Munster A	23 – 16	Nottingham (BP)

Temple Hill, Cork
Attendance: 435
Referee: D Jones

29 November 2014
15:00

(BP) Worcester Warriors	31 – 12	Moseley

Sixways Stadium
Attendance: 4,738
Referee: David Proctor

5 December 2014
19:30

(BP) Munster A	18 – 23	Worcester Warriors

Temple Hill, Cork
Attendance: 600
Referee: Rhys Thomas

7 December 2014
15:00

(2BP) Nottingham	26 – 27	Moseley (BP)

Lady Bay Sports Ground
Attendance: 569

13 December 2014
14:00

Moseley	13 – 35	Munster A (BP)

Billesley
Attendance: 944
Referee: John Meredith

13 December 2014
14:00

(BP) Worcester Warriors	43 – 22	Nottingham

Sixways Stadium
Attendance: 6,560
Referee: Darren Gamage

=== Pool 4 ===
Team	Pld	W	D	L	PF	PA	PD	TB	LB	Pts
(England) Doncaster Knights	6	6	0	0	204	122	+82	5	0	29
(England) Bedford Blues	6	3	0	3	180	154	+26	3	2	17
(England) Cornish Pirates	6	2	0	4	187	189	−2	4	4	16
(Wales) Cross Keys	6	1	0	5	119	225	−106	2	1	7

Source: BBC
Rules for classification: 4 points for a win; 2 points for a draw; 1 bonus point for a loss by seven points or less; 1 bonus point for scoring four or more tries in a match

11 October 2014
14:30

(2BP) Cross Keys	32 – 37	Doncaster Knights (BP)
	Cross Keys; Doncaster

Pandy Park
Attendance: 401
Referee: Sean Gallagher (IRFU)

12 October 2014
15:00

(BP) Cornish Pirates	28 – 34	Bedford Blues (BP)
	Pirates; Bedford

Mennaye Field
Attendance: 1,289
Referee: Andy Rawson (RFU)

- This match finished with a 35 – 34 victory to Cornish Pirates. However, in the 72nd minute the match went to uncontested scrums as Pirates were unable to provide a front-row replacement for injured prop Tyler Gendall. Pirates should have reduced to 14 men on the pitch, in accordance with the regulations but, instead, Gendall was replaced with fly-half Bertie Hokpin (who scored the winning try) and continued with 15 men. The Organising Committee decided to award the match to Bedford with a 28 – 34 scoreline, the score at the time that the scums went uncontested. Pirates are considering an appeal. Pirates' appeal failed to overturn the decision.

18 October 2014
14:30

(BP) Doncaster Knights	27 – 25	Cornish Pirates (BP)
	Doncaster; Pirates

Castle Park
Attendance: 1,374
Referee: Rhys Thomas (WRU)

18 October 2014
15:00

(BP) Bedford Blues	22 – 23	Cross Keys
	Bedford; Cross Keys

Goldington Road
Attendance: 2,425
Referee: Stuart Gaffikin (IRFU)

25 October 2014
14:30

(BP) Doncaster Knights	36 – 20	Bedford Blues
	Doncaster; Bedford

Castle Park
Attendance: 1,182
Referee: John Meredith (RFU)

26 October 2014
15:00

(BP) Cornish Pirates	34 – 33	Cross Keys (BP)
	Pirates; Cross Keys

Mennaye Field
Attendance: 1,320
Referee: Andrew Jackson (RFU)

28 November 2014
19:45

(BP) Bedford Blues	15 – 17	Doncaster Knights

Goldington Road
Attendance: 2,002
Referee: Andrew Small

28 November 2014
19:45

Cross Keys	21 – 30	Cornish Pirates (BP)

Pandy Park
Attendance: 650
Referee: Sean Gallagher

6 December 2014
14:30

Cross Keys	10 – 48	Bedford Blues (BP)

Pandy Park
Attendance: 200
Referee: Andrew Brace

6 December 2014
15:00

(2BP) Cornish Pirates	30 – 31	Doncaster Knights (BP)

Mennaye Field
Attendance: 1,149
Referee: Craig Maxwell-Keys

13 December 2014
14:00

(BP) Bedford Blues	41 – 40	Cornish Pirates (2BP)

Goldington Road
Attendance: 2,218
Referee: Matthew O'Grady

13 December 2014
14:00

(BP) Doncaster Knights	54 – 0	Cross Keys

Castle Park
Attendance: 1,421
Referee: Stuart Graffikin

=== Pool 5 ===
Team	Pld	W	D	L	PF	PA	PD	TB	LB	Pts
(Ireland) Leinster A	6	5	0	1	229	115	+114	3	1	24
(Wales) Carmarthen Quins	6	4	0	2	126	169	−43	1	0	17
Jersey	6	2	0	4	109	128	−19	1	1	10
(England) Plymouth Albion	6	1	0	5	121	173	−52	2	3	9

Source: BBC
Rules for classification: 4 points for a win; 2 points for a draw; 1 bonus point for a loss by seven points or less; 1 bonus point for scoring four or more tries in a match

11 October 2014
15:00

(BP) Jersey	37 – 17	Carmarthen Quins
	Jersey; Carmarthen

St Peter
Attendance: 1,754
Referee: Andrew Brace (IRFU)

11 October 2014
15:00

(2 BP) Plymouth Albion	24 – 31	Leinster A
	Plymouth; Leinster

Brickfields
Attendance: 1,047
Referee: David Proctor (RFU)

17 October 2014
19:30

Leinster A	26 – 6	Jersey
	Leinster; Jersey

Donnybrook
Attendance: 720
Referee: Matthew O'Grady (RFU)

18 October 2014
14:30

Carmarthen Quins	29 – 16	Plymouth Albion
	Carmarthen; Plymouth

Parc y Scarlets
Attendance: 400
Referee: Jamie Leahy (RFU)

25 October 2014
14:30

Carmarthen Quins	26 – 24	Leinster A (BP)
	Carmarthen; Leinster

Carmarthen Park
Attendance: 200
Referee: David Procter (RFU)

25 October 2014
15:00

(BP) Plymouth Albion	16 – 22	Jersey
	Plymouth; Jersey

Brickfields
Attendance: 875
Referee: Greg Macdonald (RFU)

28 November 2014
19:30

Jersey	14 – 23	Plymouth Albion

St Peter
Attendance: 2,204
Referee: Fergus Kirby

29 November 2014
13:00

(BP) Leinster A	67 – 12	Carmarthen Quins

Donnybrook
Attendance: 739
Referee: Craig Maxwell-Keys

6 December 2014
15:00

(BP) Jersey	21 – 22	Leinster A (BP)

St Peter
Attendance: 1,695
Referee: Simon Rees

6 December 2014
15:00

(BP) Plymouth Albion	16 – 18	Carmarthen Quins

Brickfields
Attendance: 1,023
Referee: Nigel Correll

13 December 2014
14:00

(BP) Carmarthen Quins	24 – 9	Jersey

Carmarthen Park
Attendance: 200
Referee: Andrew Brace

13 December 2014
14:00

(BP) Leinster A	59 – 26	Plymouth Albion (BP)

Donnybrook
Attendance: 827
Referee: Ben Whitehouse

== Knock-out stage ==
Quarter-finals
24 January 2015 – Castle Park
(England) Doncaster Knights	38
(Ireland) Munster A	17
23 January 2015 – Ashton Gate
(England) Bristol	41
(England) Yorkshire Carnegie	28
24 January 2015 – Sixways Stadium
(England) Worcester Warriors	24
(Wales) Pontypridd	10
24 January 2015 – Clifton Lane
(England) Rotherham Titans	32
(Ireland) Leinster A	51

Semi-finals
14 March 2015 – Castle Park
(England) Doncaster Knights	27
(England) Bristol	22
13 March 2015 – Sixways Stadium
(England) Worcester Warriors	15
(Ireland) Leinster A	13

Final
3 April 2015 – Castle Park
(England) Doncaster Knights	5
(England) Worcester Warriors	35

=== Quarter-finals ===
23 January 2015
19:45

Bristol	41 – 28	Yorkshire Carnegie
	Bristol

Ashton Gate
Attendance: 3,467
Referee: Craig Maxwell-Keys

24 January 2015
14:00

Doncaster Knights	38 – 17	Munster A
	Munster

Castle Park
Attendance: 1,174
Referee: Dan Jones

24 January 2015
14:00

Rotherham Titans	32 – 51	Leinster A
	Leinster

Clifton Lane
Attendance: 1,167
Referee: Craig Evans

24 January 2015
15:00

Worcester Warriors	24 – 10	Pontypridd
	Warriors

Sixways Stadium
Attendance: 4,605
Referee: Andrew Brace

=== Semi-finals ===
13 March 2015
19:45

Worcester Warriors	15 – 13	Leinster A
	Leinster

Sixways Stadium
Attendance: 3,760
Referee: Craig Evans

14 March 2015
14:00

Doncaster Knights	27 – 22	Bristol
	Bristol

Castle Park
Attendance: 785
Referee: Andrew Jackson

=== Final ===
3 April 2015
17:10

Doncaster Knights	5 – 35	Worcester Warriors
	BBC; Warriors; Doncaster

Castle Park
Attendance: 3,115
Referee: Andrew Brace

== Total season attendances ==
- Does not include Welsh qualification matches.

Club	Home Games	Total	Average	Highest	Lowest	% Capacity
Aberavon	3	1,530	510	830	250	17%
Bedford Blues	3	6,645	2,215	2,425	2,002	44%
Bristol Rugby	4	21,475	5,369	7,640	3,467	25%
Carmarthen Quins	3	800	267	400	200	5%
Connacht Eagles	2 (Note: No attendance found for the game between Connacht Eagles and Pontypridd so Connacht only had 2 home game attendances listed.)	459	230	250	209	3%
Cornish Pirates	3	3,758	1,253	1,320	1,149	36%
Cross Keys	3	1,251	417	650	200	14%
Doncaster Knights	6	9,051	1,509	3,115	785	30%
Jersey	3	5,653	1,884	2,204	1,695	38%
Leinster A	3	2,286	762	827	720	13%
London Scottish	3	4,544	1,515	1,640	1,296	34%
Moseley	3	2,677	892	1,483	250	30%
Munster A	3	1,585	528	600	435	52%
Nottingham Rugby	3	2,444	815	1,119	569	13%
Plymouth Albion	3	2,945	982	1,047	875	12%
Pontypridd	3	9,900	3,300	5,800	1,500	42%
Rotherham Titans	4	4,081	1,020	1,167	827	41%
Ulster Ravens	3	1,150	383	600	150	19%
Worcester Warriors	5	26,579	5,316	6,916	3,760	44%
Yorkshire Carnegie	3	1,996	665	864	482	36%

== Individual statistics ==
- Note if players are tied on tries or points the player with the lowest number of appearances will come first. Also note that points scorers includes tries as well as conversions, penalties and drop goals.

=== Top points scorers ===
Rank	Player	Team	Appearances	Points
1	(Scotland) Douglas Flockhart	Doncaster Knights	8	89
2	(England) Tiff Eden	Worcester Warriors	6	75
3	(England) Tom Barrett	Rotherham Titans	6	70
4	(England) Simon Humberstone	Pontypridd	7	68
5	(Ireland) Cathal Marsh	Leinster A	6	66
6	(Ireland) Rory Scannell	Munster A	7	65
7	(Canada) James Pritchard	Bedford Blues	4	52
8	(England) Aaron Penberthy	Jersey	6	47
9	(Ireland) Ross Byrne	Leinster A	3	45
9	(Ireland) Kieran Hallett	Cornish Pirates	3	45

=== Top try scorers ===
Rank	Player	Team	Appearances	Tries
1	(Ireland) Cian Kelleher	Leinster A	8	9
2	(England) Jonah Holmes	Yorkshire Carnegie	4	7
3	(Ireland) Sam Coghlan-Murray	Leinster A	8	7
4	(England) Paul Jarvis	Doncaster Knights	9	7
5	(England) Oliver Robinson	Bristol	3	6
6	(England) Jack Preece	Rotherham Titans	7	6
7	(England) Sam Betty	Worcester Warriors	3	5
8	(Ireland) Michael Keating	Rotherham Titans	5	5
9	(England) Patrick Tapley	Bedford Blues	5	5
10	(Wales) Liam Belcher	Pontypridd	6	5
