= Lucas Schmid =

English rugby union player (born 2004)

- Born: 13 October 2004 (age 22) Rotherham, England
- Height: 1.90 m (6 ft 3 in)
- Weight: 104 kg (16 st 5 lb; 229 lb)
- School: Epsom College
- Notable relative: Mike Schmid (father)

Rugby union career
- Position: Back row
- Current team: Harlequins
Senior career
| Years | Team | Apps | (Points) |
| 2024– | Harlequins | 17 | (5) |
| 2024 | → [Richmond (loan) | | |
- Correct as of 25 October 2026
International career
| Years | Team | Apps | (Points) |
| 2023 | England U18 | 2 | (0) |
| 2024 | England U20 | | |
- Correct as of 1 February 2025

Lucas Schmid (born 13 October 2004) is an English professional rugby union footballer who plays in the back row for PREM Rugby side Harlequins.

== Club career ==
In November 2024, Schmid made his debut for Harlequins in the Premiership Rugby Cup against London Scottish, scoring a try on debut in a 35-22 win. He was also dual registered with Richmond, featuring on loan for them in the 2024-25 season. He made his Rugby Premiership debut for Harlequins away against Bath Rugby on 29 March 2025, featuring as a late replacement for Chandler Cunningham-South.

== International career ==
An England under-18 international in 2023, in January 2024, he was called-up to the England U20 squad.

== Personal life ==
He was educated at Epsom College. His father Mike Schmid played professionally for Rotherham Titans and Canada at No.8 before a spell as director of rugby at Esher RFC.
