= Balling =

Balling may refer to:

== Places ==
- Balling, a small town in Skive Municipality in Denmark

== People ==
- Erik Balling (1924–2005), Danish film director
- Michael Balling (1866–1925), German violist and conductor
- Rich Balling (fl. 1997–2010), American musician, producer, and curator
- Robert Balling (born 1952), American professor of geography
- Rudi Balling (born 1953), German geneticist
- Ulrik Balling (born 1975), Danish footballer

== Other ==
- Balling scale, a method for measuring brix (sugar content), formerly used in breweries
- Balling the queen, a defense technique used by honeybees

== See also ==
- Ballin (disambiguation)
- Bawling, or crying
- Ballinger (disambiguation)
- Baller (disambiguation)
