= Vallini =

Vallini is a surname. Notable people with the surname include:

- Agostino Vallini (born 1940), Italian cardinal
- André Vallini (born 1956), French politician

== See also ==
- Ballini
