= Ballini =

Ballini is an Italian surname. Notable people with the surname include:

- Camillo Ballini (1540–c.1592), Italian painter of the late-Renaissance or Mannerist period
- Marco Ballini (1998), Italian-Thai professional footballer
- Matias Ballini (born 1988), Argentine professional footballer
- Roberto Ballini (born 1944), Italian former racing cyclist

== See also ==
- Ballin (disambiguation)
