= Terry Garnett =

English rugby union player

Terry Garnett strongest hooker
- Born: Terence Ashley Garnett; 10 May 1967 (age 59) North Ferriby, Yorkshire, England
- School: Hymers College
- University: Nottingham Trent
- Occupation: Chartered Surveyor

Rugby union career
- Position: Hooker / Flanker
Youth career
- Hull and East Riding
Senior career
Years	Team	Apps	(Points)
1988/89 - 1997/98	Wakefield RFC	39	(30)
1998/99 -2000/01	Rotherham	56	(45)
2001/02 -	Hull Rugby Union	10	(0)
Provincial / State sides
Years	Team	Apps	(Points)
1992	Yorkshire		
1993	North of England		

Terry Garnett (born 10 May 1967) is a former rugby union player who played as a flanker or hooker for Hull and East Riding, Wakefield, Rotherham, Yorkshire and the North of England. He also represented an England XV in the RF Oakes memorial game.

Since retirement he is TV presenter/commentator and charity fundraiser.

== Judo career ==
Terry attained his senior Judo blackbelt at the age of 15, one of the youngest holders of that qualification. He was the National Judo champion at Under 78 kg, winning the Stockton Open in 1985.

He stated that his most difficult opponent was Neil Adams to whom he lost in 30 seconds.

== Rugby career ==
He began as he rugby career as a 12-year-old school boy at Hymers College and he hooked for Yorkshire Schools and Colts. He represented England Colts in 1986.

He played club rugby for Hull and East Riding before joining Wakefield RFC at the start of the 1988/89 season. He initially played as a flanker before converting to hooker He was sent off whilst playing for Wakefield in the Courage League Division 2 game against Northampton in September 1995 for "careless placement of the boot when establishing a base" against Tim Rodber and the incident was filmed by BBC TV's Rugby Special.

He made his Yorkshire debut against Cheshire during the 1992/93 season and was a member of the Yorkshire side who lost the 1993 County Championship final to Lancashire. He also played for an England XV in the R.F Oakes Memorial game. After his sending off against Northampton he was dropped from the England provisional 1995 World Cup squad.

He has also played for the North of England against New Zealand Barbarians (24/11/1996), South Africa and Argentina (1/12/1996) and toured France with the English division in 1993.

He joined Rotherham at the start of the 1998/99 following former Wakefield coach Jim Kilfoyle to Clifton Lane. He played 56 league games for Rotherham scoring 9 tries. until leaving the club after the 2000/01 season following a Severe disc prolapse in his back leading to his immediate retirement.

Post retirement he was forwards coach at Hull Ionians and coach at Hull Rugby Union.

He also qualified as a Yorkshire RFU referee.

== TV work ==
Terry presents and commentates on Rugby Union for Estuary TV.

== Charity work ==
His wife Beverley Garnett died of pancreatic cancer in February 2017 and Terry honoured her final wish by raising money for the local cancer hospital Castle Hill in Cottingham, near Hull.
