= Baller =

Baller may refer to:

== People ==
- Adolph Baller (1909–1994), Austrian-American pianist
- Frederick W. Baller (1852–1922), British missionary
- Hinrich Baller (1936–2025), German architect
- Jay Baller (born 1960), American baseball player
- Kristian Baller (born 1984), Welsh rugby union player

== Arts, entertainment, media and sports ==
- Ballers, an HBO television series
- NBA Ballers, a video game
- Oakland Ballers, a professional baseball team
- "Baller" (song), German entry for the Eurovision Song Contest 2025
- Baller League, an indoor six-a-side association football competition

== Other uses ==
- AMT Hardballer, nicknamed "baller", a handgun

== See also ==
- Old School Ballers, an Indian 3x3 basketball team
