= Camillo Ballini =

Italian painter

Camillo Ballini (Brescia 1540– c.1592) was an Italian painter of the late-Renaissance or Mannerist period. He trained with Palma il Giovane in Venice, and was employed with him in the decoration of the Ducal Palace with historical paintings during the 1570s, including the passageway between the Sala del Maggior Consiglio to the Sala dello Scrutinio. He also helped fresco the exterior facades of palaces.
