= Colin Noon =

Welsh rugby union player (born 1975)

Colin Noon (born 24 October 1975 in Bridgend) is a rugby union footballer for Leeds Tykes. His usual position is at prop.
