= Dave Scully =

England international rugby union player

- Born: David Scully; 7 August 1965 (age 61) Doncaster, England
- Height: 5 ft 8 in (1.73 m)
- Weight: 76 kg (168 lb)

Rugby union career
- Position: Scrum-half
- Current team: Wheatley Hills RUFC
Senior career
Years	Team	Apps	(Points)
- Wakefield
–	Rotherham		
–	Otley		
–	Doncaster		
–	Sheffield Tigers		
National sevens team
Years	Team		Comps
1993	England		1993 WC 7s

David Scully (born 7 August 1965) is an English rugby union former player who was part of the England 7's squad that won the 1993 Rugby World Cup Sevens in which he won the ‘moment of the tournament' for a crunching tackle on Fijian Mesake Rasari.

== Playing career ==
Dave Scully started his career at his local club of Wheatley Hills before joining Wakefield RFC in 1986. It was at Wakefield that he came to prominence, playing for Yorkshire, North of England (captaining them against the All Blacks in 1993), Barbarians, England B and England 7's. However, he never played for the full England side.

He left Wakefield in 1998 to join Rotherham before moving onto Otley, then Doncaster and Sheffield Tigers. His current club is Wheatley Hills.

He has made over 350 league appearances and is in a small group of players to score 100 league tries.

Scully is a full-time fire fighter.
