= Ballin =

Ballin or Ballin' may refer to:

== Surname ==
- Ada Ballin (1863–1906), English author
- Albert Ballin (1857–1918), German inventor of cruise ships
- Ernst Hirsch Ballin (born 1950), Dutch politician
- Hugo Ballin (1879–1956), American film director and production designer
- Mabel Ballin (1887–1958), American film actress
- Matt Ballin (born 1984), Australian rugby league player
- Mogens Ballin (1871–1914), Danish artist
- Camillo Ballin, Italian-Bahraini priest (1944-2020)

== Songs ==
- "Ballin'", a song by Bizzy Bone from the album A Song for You
- "Ballin'", a song by Chief Keef from the album Finally Rich
- "Ballin", a 2013 song by Logic featuring C Dot Castro from the album Young Sinatra: Welcome to Forever
- "Ballin" (Juicy J song), a 2016 song by Juicy J featuring Kanye West
- "Ballin'" (Young Jeezy song), a 2011 song by American rapper Young Jeezy
- "Ballin'" (Mustard and Roddy Ricch song), a 2019 song by American producer Mustard featuring rapper Roddy Ricch from the album Perfect Ten
- "Ballin", a 2022 song by American rapper A Boogie wit da Hoodie

== Other uses ==
- "Ballin'" (The Boondocks), a 2007 episode of the television series The Boondocks
- SS Albert Ballin, an ocean liner

== See also ==
- United States v. Ballin, U.S. Supreme Court case that established the constitutional definition of "quorum to do business"
- Balling (disambiguation)
