= Mike Schmid (rugby union) =

Canada international rugby union player (born 1969)

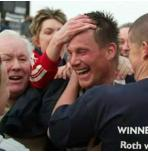
- Full name: Michael Schmid
- Born: 28 November 1969 (age 56) New Westminster, BC, Canada
- Height: 6 ft 3 in (191 cm)
- Weight: 225 lb (102 kg)

Rugby union career
- Position: No. 8
International career
Years	Team	Apps	(Points)
1996–2001	Canada	24	(10)

Michael Schmid (born November 28, 1969) is a Canadian former rugby union international.

Schmid, who grew up in Abbotsford, British Columbia, was capped in 24 Tests for Canada. He played mostly as a number eight and scored two Test tries, both of them in a narrow loss to Wales in 1997 at Markham, Ontario. In 1999, Schmid earned his first selection for a Rugby World Cup and played in all of Canada's matches.

In the late 1990s, Schmid began playing for the Rotherham Titans in Yorkshire and appeared in over 100 games for the club, steering them to the top division while captain. He ended up marrying an Englishwoman, which qualified him as a local player. Later, he had a long association with Surrey club Esher RFC, as a head coach for seven years and then becoming the CEO. He is now the director of sport at Rokeby School.

== See also ==
- List of Canada national rugby union players
