= Rotherham Titans =

English rugby union team

(England) Rotherham Titans
- Full name: Rotherham Rugby Union Football Club
- Union: Yorkshire RFU
- Nickname(s): The Titans; Roth
- Founded: 1923; 103 years ago
- Location: Rotherham, South Yorkshire, England
- Ground: Clifton Lane (Capacity: 2,500)
- Chairman: Nick Cragg
- CEO: Martin Jenkinson
- Director of Rugby: Harvey Biljon
- Coach: Matt Smith
- Captain: Harry Newborn
- Top scorer: Kevin Plant (927)
- Most tries: John Dudley (49)
- League: Champ Rugby
- 2025–26: National League 1, 1st of 14 (promoted)
Home kit

Official website
- titans-rugby.com

Rotherham Rugby Union Football Club, or Rotherham Titans is a rugby union club from Rotherham, South Yorkshire, currently playing in Champ Rugby the second tier of the English rugby union league system, following their promotion from National League 1 at the end of the 2025–2026 season.

Rotherham achieved multiple promotions within the league structure in the 1990s and early 2000s. This meteoric rise ultimately culminated in two unsuccessful spells in the English Premiership. Rotherham is perhaps best known for the Rugby Football Union blocking its entry into the Premiership, its subsequent legal challenges, and a partially successful appeal to the Office of Fair Trading to break an alleged Premiership cartel.

Rotherham have developed several international players, including David Strettle, Hendre Fourie and Erik Lund.

== History ==
=== 1923–1986 ===
During the 1920s and 1930s the club regularly turned out two teams and on odd occasions three, normally in school holiday periods when local 6th-formers played.

Rotherham in common with many clubs shut down during the Second World War and the club was reformed in 1946 at Clifton Lane. The next fifteen years were a struggle in terms of running teams and raising finance to improve facilities. The club received a big boost when a local secondary modern school started rugby and soon a regular supply of players were coming through. Rugby started to be played in many local schools and the arrival of a number of Physical Education teachers in the area who were rugby specialists helped both the playing standard and the club organisation.

Prior to the advent of a national league structure, Rotherham struggled to get fixtures against establishment sides, largely from the south of England, meaning when the league was established they were placed well down the league structure despite always showing an ambition to develop. This perceived snub by other top teams, and placement at the bottom of the rugby hierarchy fired the initial drive up the leagues and led to several former players such as Mike Yarlett investing their time and resources to transform the club.

=== 1987–1995 ===
Rotherham entered league rugby in 1987 enjoying enormous success with seven subsequent promotions culminating by eventually reaching the Premiership. In the 1988–89 season, Rotherham won the North East 1 title and so began its rise up the rugby pyramid. This was immediately followed up by five further promotions in six seasons to propel the club to the fourth tier of English rugby by 1995–96.

This period in the club's development was later to be considered the start of the "golden decade", and secured legendary status for several players including John Dudley, Richard Selkirk, Craig West and Kevin Plant. During this period Rotherham attracted some criticism for their early adoption of paying players during a period later referred to as "Shamateurism" as most progressive clubs in essence paid their players while keeping up the pretence of being Amateur clubs.

In this era, the Yorkshire Cup, still a prestigious competition in which all the top Yorkshire sides competed, became a symbolic quest for the Rotherham players and management. The competition had been dominated for the previous 25 years by Wakefield, Harrogate and the four big Leeds clubs, Headingley, Roundhay, Morley and Otley, none of whom would give Rotherham a fixture prior to the introduction of league rugby. Rotherham reached the final for the first time in their history in 1993, going down 22–5 to Otley, however 2 years later there was no doubting that Rotherham had arrived as they defeated Harrogate 39–3 at Kirkstall to win the Cup for the first and to date only time.

The 1994 County Championship final at Twickenham also provided further evidence of Rotherham's ascent to senior club status in Yorkshire, as Kevin Plant and Craig West were members of the Yorkshire side (along with soon to be Rotherham scrum-half Guy Easterby — then with Harrogate) who won the championship in exhilarating fashion with a 26–3 triumph over Durham.

Summarising the success in 1995, the independent put Rotherham's success into context saying:

The Morley outside-half Kevin Plant was the next significant arrival at Clifton Lane, with the RAF and Lancashire scrum-half Steve Worrall soon joining him. However, Forster's masterstroke was to persuade the Yorkshire No 8 Richard Selkirk to leave Headingley and take over the captaincy. With Selkirk and Forster at the helm, Rotherham swept through the Northern League, winning promotion three times – twice after unbeaten campaigns and each time as champions – to lift the Whitbread Junior Club of the Year trophy in 1992.

=== 1996–1999 ===
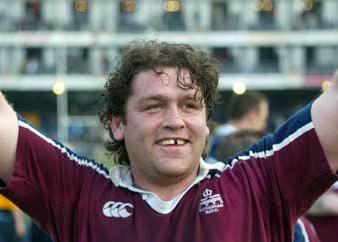
Simon Bunting

Rotherham eventually reached the Courage National Division 1 in 1996–97, finishing seventh in their first season. 1997 also witnessed one of Rotherhams stellar days at Clifton Lane in the 6th round of the Pilkington Cup. Rotherham Lost 23–42. Rotherham Advertiser 31 January 1997 said of the game:

But one thing was certain, it was another landmark in Rotherham's climb towards the top of the game. Playing Quins in the league may seem a impossibility in the current financially governed rugby climate – but then again it's not too long ago that the thought of Will Carling trotting out at Clifton Lane was merely a dream.

The 1997–98 season saw Rotherham improve on their first Division One season to fourth, while the next year 1998–99 saw Rotherham finish equal on points with first place Bristol, the West Country side prevailing on points difference, setting Roth up for a promotion playoff. Ultimately they were denied cruelly by the aggregate tries rule, having tied the scores with the Premiership's second bottom side Bedford at 38–38, leaving Rotherham to endure another season in National Division One. However, in 1999–2000 Rotherham enjoyed a near faultless season, losing only two games and winning their first National League 1 title, setting up a promotion playoff re-match with Bedford. The first leg saw Rotherham score four tries winning 40–20 at home, while the second leg was one of Rotherham's most dramatic; conceding two penalty tries losing 14–0 to win on aggregate 40–34 gaining promotion to the top tier.

=== 2000–2003 ===
For 2000–01 Rotherham won promotion to become Yorkshire's first ever representative in the top tier of English rugby. The Independent said of Rotherham entry to the premiership:

There will be a culture shock awaiting rugby union's elite clubs when they arrive in Rotherham this season, especially in the clubhouse which resonates with rugby virtues from a bygone era.... Rotherham do not recognise celebrity; they are without artifice or pretension.

The club endured a torrid yet promising year as they struggled to win games, several were lost by mere points. However, highlights of the season included victories at Clifton Lane against London Irish (19–18) and Saracens (19–8), which saw some of the biggest attendances in the club's history as up to 4,000 supporters crammed into Clifton Lane. Rotherham finished bottom and were relegated to National Division 1 after one season.

2001–02 saw Rotherham return to National One having gained experience and develop as a club. Rotherham duly romped to their second National Division One title in three years, losing only two games all season. The success of the league title was quickly dampened by the decision that Rotherham were to be denied promotion to the Premiership as they did not fulfil the ever-changing entry requirements.

Rotherham remained in National Division One for the 2002–03 determined to overcome the previous season's setback, and demonstrated their consistency by once again recording a near perfect season as they once again lost only two games all season, climaxing as Rotherham became champions by beating Worcester away in one of the club's most memorable moments. The Guardian on 13 April 2003 said of the battles with Worcester;

For years, it seems, they've been the Celtic and Rangers of their division, few other matches seeming to matter but the pair's annual pitched battles. But the big difference is that the Scottish football giants don't go up, or down. Rotherham have now all but ensured their escape from English rugby's first division with this professional-looking win, built on organisation, strong defence and no important errors

This was the club's third National Division One title in four years, and this time welcomed automatic promotion back to the premiership.

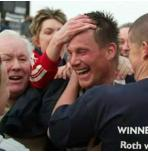
Mike Schmid embraced by fans after securing promotion

In June 2003 after a 5-month enquiry by Anthony Arlidge QC, Rotherham were acquitted of any wrongdoing in the "Rotherham-Gate" saga, an enquiry which the Premiership were generally consider to have treated with disdain, and ultimately cast serious questions over the conduct of several Premiership Chairmen. The Telegraph reported:

Rotherham have been the focus of Arlidge's considerable scrutiny. They were the only entity involved in this whole, drawn-out matter, to give him full cooperation ..'. "Mr Barwell was not prepared to put his mouth where his convictions lay," Arlidge writes .'.. Arlidge notes that "cooperation from Premier Rugby has been most disappointing and that has made my task more difficult".

The 2003–04 season saw a return to the Premiership for Rotherham and a change of name as a sponsorship deal with Titan Environmental lead to the adoption of the 'Titans' nickname. The Titans had been sharing Millmoor stadium with Rotherham United Football Club since the start of the 2002–03 season, but Millmoor proved even less of a happy top-flight hunting ground than Clifton Lane as Rotherham struggled to adapt on their return, the Titans being relegated from the top-flight of professional rugby union in 2003–04 after only one season, disappointingly without winning a single match.

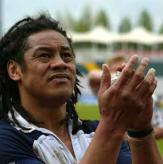
Mike Umaga in 2004, one of Rotherhams iconic players

At the end of that season, Mike Yarlett, the owner who had bankrolled the club's rise through the leagues, withdrew his backing, and extinction appeared to be a distinct possibility. It became clear Yarlett's withdrawal of his backing had come after significant frustration with the RFU at their failure to meet his request to guarantee the possibility of promotion from National Division 1 to the Premiership.

The club was rescued by a local consortium headed by local businessmen Nick Cragg and Martin Jenkinson who had both previously played for the club. Donations from supporters, assurances from Rotherham Council, who valued the club's community work, and the acceptance of savage wage cuts from players ensured that Rotherham could continue in business albeit after a return to their spiritual home ground at Clifton Lane.

In 2004 there was widespread outcry at the RFU's support of a proposed takeover of Rotherham by a South Africa consortia who wanted to move the club to London.

=== 2004–2006 ===
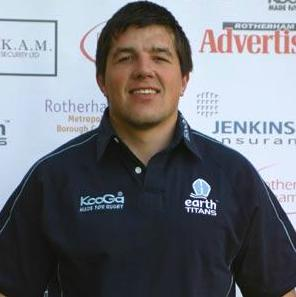
Hendre Fourie who made his name at Rotherham

The 2004–05 season started with five wins in a row for the Titans, but the reality of their financial situation, and vast scale of squad changes this had caused, soon kicked in. The Titans finished in their worst ever position in the National Division One in eighth.

2005–06 saw Andre Bester take control of the club in the double role of chief executive and head coach. With attendances between 920 and 2250, the Titans managed to improve to finish fourth in National Division One below an unstoppable Harlequins, who bounced back to the premiership. The club were known as 'Earth Titans' throughout the term of a sponsorship deal with Hellaby-based finance house Earth Money.

The next season 2006–07, the Titans lost the likes of David Strettle, a future England star and Chris Hala'ufia to Harlequins, but brought in players which Bester felt had the potential to help the Titans win National Division One, such as Ireland U21 International Gareth Steenson and Scotland 7s Andrew Turnbull. This saw a resurgence from Rotherham as they made a good start to the National Division One campaign. The most notable victory was beating Leeds 22–19 in a very close match which the Titans stole at the death with a penalty from Gareth Steenson. Rotherham finished in second place, five points behind Leeds Carnegie.

=== 2007–2010 ===
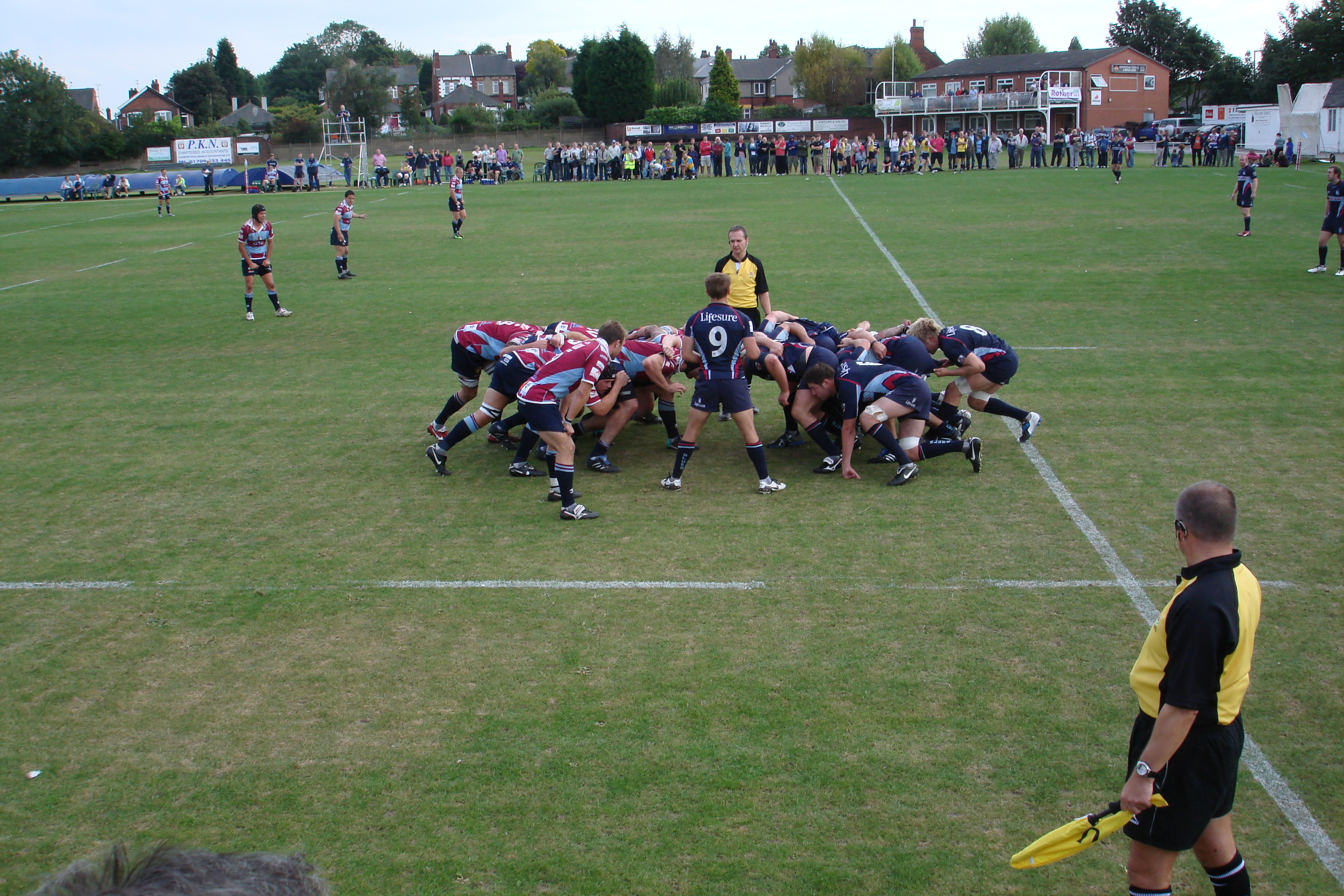
Rotherham Titans scrum down vs. Bedford Blues.

The Titans signed a record sponsorship deal with Complete Technical Services in June 2007, however 2007–08 was a disappointing season following on from the previous years success as Titans slumped to eleventh. Northampton recorded a perfect season going unbeaten and returning to the Premiership. Rotherham finished the 2008–09 season in tenth as they sought to rebuild the team. 2009–10 saw Rotherham's worst league finish in thirteen years since they were first promoted to National Division One. Despite this poor finish, and finding themselves in the relegation playoffs, they never looked in danger of demotion as they won all but one of their games to top the group.

Rotherham looked to mount a fresh challenge for the 2010–11 season and succeeded in improving on the previous few seasons, finishing seventh and in the promotion playoffs. Ryan Burrows, Juan Pablo Socino & Adam Kettle enjoyed particularly impressive seasons respectively. Andre Bester aimed to secure a squad for the following year prior to the playoffs and the club effectively released several players prior to the end of the season, the ensuing lack of motivation being a contributory factor to the Titans losing every playoff game to finish the season.

=== 2011–2012 ===
The 2011–12 RFU Championship brought excitement back to the club as many new faces were brought in while retaining the core of the previous years squad. Titans assembled one of the largest packs in the league backed up with an impressive back line and quickly became a team to fear. New players such as Semisi Tualava, Palepoi Nonu, Adrian "The Enforcer" Griffiths, Garry Law, Robin Copeland & Jimmy Williams had an immediate positive impact, whilst the likes of Rob O'Donnell, Jamie Kilbane & Cliffie Hodgson extended their stay to further bolster the squad. The club enjoyed a run of seven unbeaten home games in the Championship including impressive victories against Bristol (44–6), Bedford (40–32) and also winning on the road at London Welsh (33–25). Rotherham currently have a winning record and are aiming for a top four finish leading to the promotion playoffs.

As of January 2012 Rotherham were the number one ranked team in Yorkshire, overtaking Leeds Carnegie and the third highest team in the North of England behind only Sale Sharks and the Newcastle Falcons

On 24 January Rotherham signed two scrum halves on trial, Dale Farnham joined from Plymouth Albion; and Danny Matthews who had previously played at Leeds Met University alongside teammates Barney Maddison and Ben Hooper while playing at the university. Subsequently, on 25 January, Rotherham also signed Tom Armes as a dual registered player from Leicester Tigers.

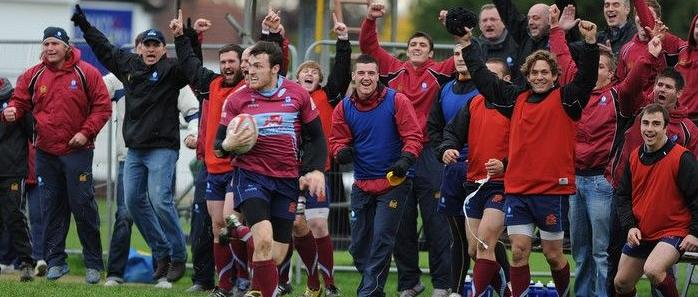
Rotherham Titans securing a 4 try bonus point against Bristol Rugby

=== 2013–present ===
Rotherham finished the 2013–14 season in the play-offs, losing narrowly to Bristol in the first leg of the semi-finals (17–14) and more comprehensively (11–22) in the return fixture at Clifton Lane. Another play-off year was to follow in 2014–15, with the Titans again losing to Bristol in the semi-finals.

2015–16 saw a dramatic turnaround in events, with the Titans not only finishing outside of the play-offs, but in 10th place. 2016–17 was even worse for the Titans, culminating in an 11th-place finish. In March 2017, head coach Justin Burnell was sacked after a run of one win in fourteen games. He was swiftly replaced with former Yorkshire boss Andy Key. Without the mid-season liquidation of London Welsh, the Titans would have been relegated to National League 1.

Prior to the 2017–18 season, the Titans announced a multi-year kit deal with Scimitar Sportswear. Rotherham would finish the 2017–18 season bottom of the Championship, with the club relegated to National League 1. This will see Rotherham playing third tier rugby for the first time since the 1995–96 season.

== Historic rivalries ==
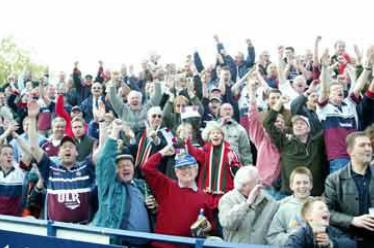
Rotherham fans celebrate famous win away at Worcester

Due to Rotherham's rapid rise up the league structure it wasn't until the late 1990s that they developed any regular rivals. The first of these were Wakefield who were the most senior team from Yorkshire in the upper levels of rugby union. At the time Wakefield had a number of the most experienced players outside the top flight including Dave Scully, Terry Garnett and Rod Latham all of whom eventually moved to play for Rotherham as Roth superseded Wakefield as the senior side in Yorkshire.

Unusually the next two rivals weren't local, both Bedford Blues and Worcester Warriors were promotion rivals to Rotherham and had a number of epic games between 1999 and 2002. During this period Rotherham were regular victors over both of these teams including against Bedford in a play off to gain promotion to the Premiership, and in a key game against Worcester Warriors which all but sealed promotion to the Premiership for the second time.

The third period of rivalry pitted Rotherham against local rivals Leeds Carnegie and then Doncaster Knights.

== Home ground ==
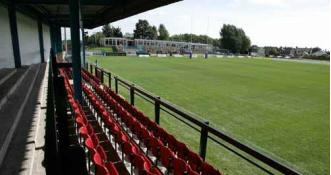
Clifton Lane in 2004

Rotherham play their home games at Clifton Lane sports ground (capacity 2,500) which they share with Rotherham Town Cricket Club. As a result, the club has been unable to develop the ground, as the Titans pitch serves as the outfield for the cricket club. In 2001–02 during Rotherham's first season in the premiership the club expanded the capacity to approximately 4,000 by using temporary stands which were situated on the south east side of the ground. The ground consists of a main covered stand referred to as "the shed", and a number of concrete standing areas and small terraces. "The Shed" is generally considered to produce a highly partisan and passionate atmosphere on match days and is often quoted as being part of the team's strong home record.

Rotherham Titans moved to Clifton Lane in the late 1930s and have played every league season at Clifton Lane apart from the 2003–04 Premiership season during Rotherham's second stint as they instead shared Millmoor stadium with Rotherham United Football Club to satisfy promotion criteria. Rotherham returned to Clifton Lane the following year.

The Titans still need to resolve issues surrounding facilities. They have been turned down for promotion before due to this, and require better facilities if they are to be promoted. As aforementioned The Titans have shared Millmoor stadium with Rotherham United Football Club in the past. Rotherham United Football Club’s Chairman, Dennis Coleman, had mentioned the possibility of sharing the newly constructed New York Stadium. However the Titans opted out of the use of this stadium as they pursued alternative facilities.

In 2010–11 season, the ground was sponsored by Stafforce recruitment and is sometimes quoted as being called the "Stafforce Stadium".

In 2011 Rotherham Titans spent several months seeking an agreement with the owners of Millmoor CF Booth Ltd to use the unused stadium as their home ground. After much speculation it was announced in December 2011 that the Titans would remain at Clifton Lane for the foreseeable future due to the deal falling through.

=== Community Foundation ===
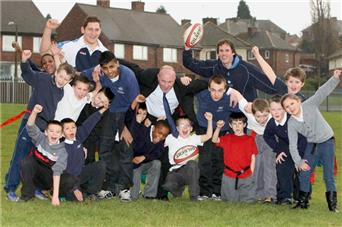
Titans Community Foundation at work

Clifton Lane is the base for several high-profile community programmes through the club's flagship Community Foundation. The Community Foundation has received considerable praise for working with vulnerable and disadvantaged young people, using the players as role models helping to improve the participants' life skills.

Instrumental in the foundation's set up was Brian Chapple, who later went on to be the Community Foundation at Rotherham United. While the foundation was set up to support the community, the value added by the foundation was one of the main reasons that Rotherham Council helped save the Titans after financial meltdown in 2003.

== Honours ==
- North East 1 champions: 1988–89
- North Division 2 champions: 1989–90
- North Division 1 champions: 1991–92
- Courage League Division 5 North champions: 1993–94
- Courage League Division 4 / National League 2 North champions (2): 1994–95, 2023–24
- Yorkshire Cup winners: 1995
- Allied Dunbar Premiership Two/National Division One champions (3): 1999–00, 2001–02, 2002–03
- Powergen Shield winners: 2002
- Selkirk Sevens champions (2): 2002, 2003
- National League 1 champions: 2025–26

== Current standings ==
2026–27 Champ Rugby table
Pos	Team	Pld	W	D	L	PF	PA	PD	TF	TA	TB	LB	Pts	Qualification
1	Worcester Warriors	5	5	0	0	246	95	+151	37	14	4	0	24	Play-off semi-finals
2	Ealing Trailfinders	5	4	0	1	242	109	+133	38	16	4	1	21	Play-off semi-finals
3	Coventry	5	4	0	1	243	171	+72	36	26	2	1	19	Play-off quarter-finals
4	Rotherham Titans	5	4	0	1	160	191	−31	25	29	1	0	17	Play-off quarter-finals
5	Ampthill	5	4	0	1	195	195	0	29	29	0	0	16	Play-off quarter-finals
6	Cornish Pirates	5	3	0	2	182	187	−5	27	28	2	0	14	Play-off quarter-finals
7	Chinnor	5	3	0	2	180	183	−3	22	21	1	0	13	
8	Doncaster Knights	5	2	0	3	161	152	+9	24	21	1	2	11	
9	Bedford Blues	5	2	0	3	143	158	−15	22	24	2	1	11	
10	Blackheath	5	1	0	4	146	189	−43	20	27	0	3	7	
11	Caldy	5	1	0	4	176	206	−30	25	31	0	2	6	
12	Nottingham	5	1	0	4	128	206	−78	19	32	0	1	5	Relegation play-off
13	Hartpury	5	1	0	4	116	207	−91	16	31	0	1	5	Relegation play-off
14	Richmond	5	0	0	5	123	192	−69	19	29	0	1	1	Relegated

First match(es) will be played: 18 September 2026. Source:
Rules for classification: If teams are level at any stage, tiebreakers are applied in the following order:
1. Number of matches won
2. Number of matches drawn
3. Difference between points for and against
4. Total number of points for
5. Aggregate number of points scored in matches between tied teams
6. Number of matches won excluding the first match, then the second and so on until the tie is settled

== Club personnel ==
=== Club officials ===
- (England) Nick Cragg – chairman
- (England) Martin Jenkinson – CEO

=== Club staff ===
- (England) John Whaling – Commercial Director
- (England) Samantha Scholey - Club General Manager
- (South Africa) Harvey Biljon – DOR
- (England) Matt Smith – Assistant Coach
- (Australia) Alex Stajka – Attack Coach
- (England) Adam Migdalski – Analyst
- (England) Calum Donohoe – S&C Coach
- (Argentina) Agustin Defelitto – Media
- (England) Tony Jenkinson – Team Manager
- (England) Chris Myers – Club Doctor
- (England) David Swift – Head Physio
- (England) James Mellor – Team Doctor
- (England) Sophie Oliver – Physio
- (England) Tom Vickers – Kit Manager
- (England) Mark Gabriel social media

- Facebook & X page & also 50/50 ticket seller

- (England) Lindsay Jones - social media - X Page ~ Match Reporter
- (England) Martin Gabriel - on pitch match day announcer

== Club records ==
- Most consecutive victories: 38 (10 November 2001 to 15 March 2003)
- Most consecutive defeats: 23 (26 April 2003 to 8 May 2004)
- Largest home win: 102–3 v Moseley (2002–03)
- Largest away win: 75–7 v Moseley (2002–03)
- Most points scored in a season: 1,099 (2001–02)
- Most tries scored in a match: 14 v Moseley (2002–03)
- Most tries scored in a season: 159 (2001–02)
- Largest points total by one player in a match: 41 Simon Binns (3T 2P 10C) v West Hartlepool (1999–00)
- Most tries by a player in one match: 6 Paul Scott v Westoe (1988–89)
- Most conversions by a player: 10 Simon Binns v West Hartlepool (1999–00; Mike Umaga v Waterloo (1999–00); Ramiro Pez v Moseley (2002–03)
- Most penalties by a player: 6 David Francis v Keighley (1988–89); Dean Lax v London Scottish (1996–97)
- Most drop-goals by a player: 2 Kevin Plant v Coventry (1995–96)
- Most conversions in a season: 107 (2001–02)
- Most points by one player in a season: 273 Juan Pablo Socino (2010–11)
- Most tries by one player: 22 Mike Wood (2002–03)
- Most conversions by one player in a season: 79 Gareth Steenson (2006–07)
- Most penalties by one player in a season: 51 Juan Pablo Socino (2010–11)
- Most drop-goals by one player in a season: 5 Kevin Plant (1995–96)
- Most penalty tries in a season: 12 (2006–07)
- Most career points: 927 Kevin Plant (1987–96)
- Most career tries: 49 John Dudley (1987–00)
- Most career conversions: 142 Ramiro Pez (2001–05)
- Most career penalties: 184 Kevin Plant (1987–96)
- Most career drop-goals: 17 Kevin Plant (1987–96)
- Largest home gate: 6,195 v Bath Rugby (2003–04) (Zurich Premiership)
- Largest away defeat: 82–3 v London Irish (2016–17) (Greene King IPA Championship)
- Largest home defeat: 68–12 v Bath Rugby (2000–01) (Zurich Premiership)
- Most tries conceded in a match: 12 v London Irish (2016–17) (Greene King IPA Championship)

Statistics Sourced

=== League history ===
- 1987–88 North East Division One finished in 2nd place
- 1988–89 North East Division One unbeaten champions
- 1989–90 North Division Two champions
- 1990–91 North Division One finished in 3rd place
- 1991–92 North Division One unbeaten champions
- 1992–93 National Division Four North finished in 2nd place
- 1993–94 National Division Five North champions
- 1994–95 National League Four champions
- 1995–96 National League Three finished in 4th place and promoted
- 1996–97 National League Two finished in 7th place
- 1997–98 Prem Div Two finished in 4th place and play-offs
- 1998–99 Prem Div Two finished in 2nd place and play-offs
- 1999–00 Prem Div Two champions and won play-offs
- 2000–01 Prem Div One finished in 12th place and relegated
- 2001–02 National Div One champions and denied promotion
- 2002–03 National Div One champions and won promotion
- 2003–04 Premiership finished 12th and relegated
- 2004–05 National Division One 8th place
- 2005–06 National Division One 4th place
- 2006–07 National Division One 2nd place
- 2007–08 National Division One 11th place
- 2008–09 National Division One 10th place
- 2009–10 National Division One 10th place
- 2010–11 National Division One 7th place
- 2011–12 RFU Championship 7th place
- 2012–13 RFU Championship 7th place
- 2013–14 RFU Championship 4th place and playoffs
- 2014–15 RFU Championship 4th place and playoffs
- 2015–16 RFU Championship 10th place
- 2016–17 RFU Championship 11th place

== Greatest ever team ==
After some debate during March 2011, the Rotherham Titans fans voted for a greatest ever team of players and coaching staff. The fans decided on:

- 15 Bernardo Stortoni
- 14 David Strettle
- 13 Kevin Maggs
- 12 Mike Umaga
- 11 Errie Claassens
- 10 Ramiro Pez
- 9 Dave Scully
- 8 Mike Schmid (captain)
- 7 Hendre Fourie
- 6 Craig West
- 5 John Dudley
- 4 Glen Kenworthy
- 3 Colin Noon
- 2 Chris Johnson
- 1 Simon Bunting
- Coach: Jim Kilfoyle
- Captain: Mike Schmid

== Notable former players ==
Famous or notable players, as defined by attaining international caps, a significant step up to a premiership club or a significant number of league appearances for Rotherham.

- (England) David Strettle
- (England) Hendre Fourie
- (England) Ross Batty
- (England) Rob Thirlby
- (England) Dave Scully
- (England) John Dudley
- (England) John Bentley
- (England) Lee Blackett
- (England) Jon Golding
- (Scotland) Sean Lamont
- Sam Dickinson
- (Argentina) Bernardo Stortoni
- (Ireland) Kevin Maggs
- (Ireland) Gareth Steenson
- (Ireland) Guy Easterby
- (South Africa) Jannie Bornman
- (South Africa) Errie Claassens
- (Namibia) Tinus du Plessis
- (United States) Luke Gross
- (Tonga) Chris Hala'ufia
- (Fiji) Jacob Rauluni
- (Spain) Oriol Ripol
- (Samoa) Mike Umaga
- (Samoa) Isaac Fe'aunati
- (Italy) Ramiro Pez
- (Canada) Adam Kleeberger
- (Canada) Mike Schmid
- (Zimbabwe) Doug Trivella
- (New Zealand) Henry Paul
- (Norway) Erik Lund
- (Wales) Colin Noon
- (Portugal) Francisco Vieira
- (Australia) Matt Minogue

=== Notable former coaches ===
- (England) John Phillips
- (England) Ged Glynn
- (England) Jim Kilfoyle
- (England) Steve Cousins
- (South Africa) André Bester subsequently returned as head coach
- (Canada) Mike Schmid

- (England) Gareth Lewis

== Sponsorship ==
Rotherham currently have two major shirt sponsors, one for each of the home and away kits, these being:

- Jenkinson insurance
- Stafforce Recruitment

Additional sponsors and partners as of February 2012 include:

- Willmott Dixon
- Cap Gemini
- Rotherham Enterprise Agency
- Tata Steel Europe
- Parkgate Shopping
- AESSeal Ltd

Previous sponsors include:

- Titan Environmental: whose sponsorship deal led to Rotherham changing their name to "Rotherham Titans"
- Earth Mortgages: whose sponsorship deal led to Rotherham Titans briefly change their playing name to "Earth Titans"
- Yorkshire Windows: who were owned by one time Rotherham Chairman Mike Yarlett, several Rotherham players also worked for Yorkshire Windows.
- Magnus Group: sponsored Rotherham during their first spell in the premiership
- Complete Technical Services Ltd
