= Kristian Baller =

Welsh rugby footballer

Personal information
- Full name: Anthony Kristian Baller
- Born: 18 February 1987 (age 39) Abercynon, Rhondda Cynon Taf, Wales

Playing information
- Position: Fullback, Wing, Scrum-half
Club
| Years | Team | Pld | T | G | FG | P |
|---|---|---|---|---|---|---|
| 2020 | West Wales Raiders | 0 | 0 | 0 | 0 | 0 |
- As of 19 Oct 2021

Anthony Kristian Baller (born 18 February 1987) is a rugby league footballer who plays for the West Wales Raiders in League 1.

== Background ==
Baller was born in Abercynon, Wales.

== Playind career ==
Kristian Baller played his youth rugby for Merthyr RFC before returning to his hometown club at senior level.

Gaining international honours with Wales at under 18 level, and touring with the Wales Crawshays under 20s, Kristian gained a reputation as an attacking full back or wing and a competent goal kicker.

Invited to join Pontypridd as a trialist during the summer of 2006, Kristian was duly drafted into the club's senior squad for the commencement of the ensuing season. Making some impressive try scoring appearances in Ponty's league and campaigns, Kristian was called up to the Blues regional under 20 squad.

Playing across numerous positions during the 2008–2009 season, Kristian was able to cover almost any three-quarter position.

At the commencement of the 2009–2010 season, in a squad blessed with wingers and full backs, Kristian decided that he would opt for Scrum Half as his preferred position, hoping that the move would lead to further honours.
