= Clifton Lane =

Sports stadium in Rotherham, England

Coordinates: 53.42644°N 1.34377°W

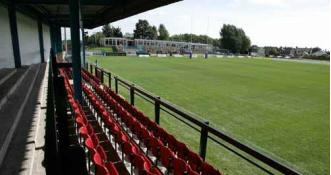
- Interactive map of Clifton Lane
- Location: Rotherham, South Yorkshire
- Capacity: 2,500

Tenant
- Rotherham Titans

Clifton Lane is a sports stadium located in Rotherham, South Yorkshire, England. It is the home ground of the professional rugby union team Rotherham Titans who play in the National League 1.

Clifton Lane is also home to the Rotherham Town Cricket Club, known as the 'Builders'. The club play in the highly regarded ECB Yorkshire League and South Yorkshire League.

== Bibliography ==
- Vasili, Phil. The first Black footballer, Arthur Wharton, 1865-1930: an absence of memory. Frank Caas Publishers, 1998.
