= Sardis Road =

Rugby union stadium in Pontypridd, Wales

- Heol Sardis
- House of Pain
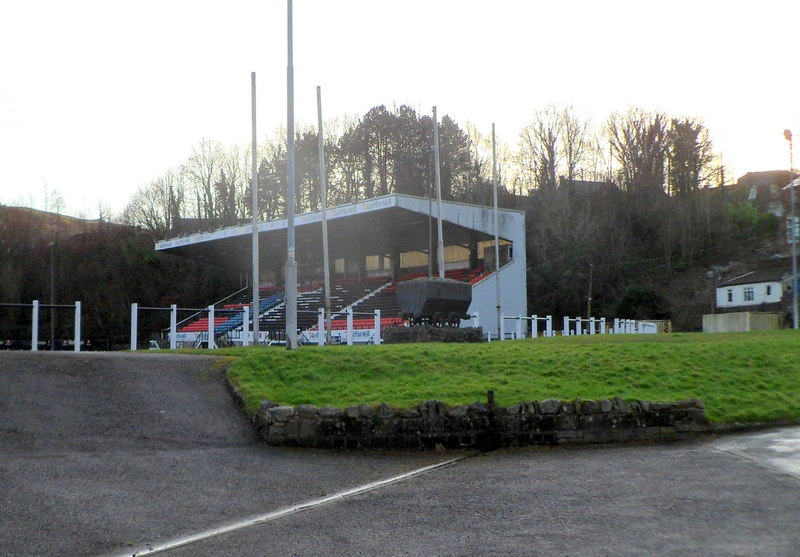
- The Grandstand at Sardis Road
- Interactive map of Sardis Road
- Location: Pontypridd, Wales
- Coordinates: 51°36′5″N 3°20′53″W
- Owner: Ponty Rugby Limited
- Capacity: 7,861
- Surface: Artificial Grass / 3G

Construction
- Opened: September 1974

Tenants
- Pontypridd RFC (1974-present); Celtic Warriors (2003-2004)

Sardis Road (Welsh: Heol Sardis) is a rugby union stadium situated in Pontypridd, Wales. It is home to the Indigo Group Premiership team, Pontypridd RFC and previously the Celtic Warriors, the now defunct regional rugby union team. It is commonly known as the "House of Pain".

== History ==
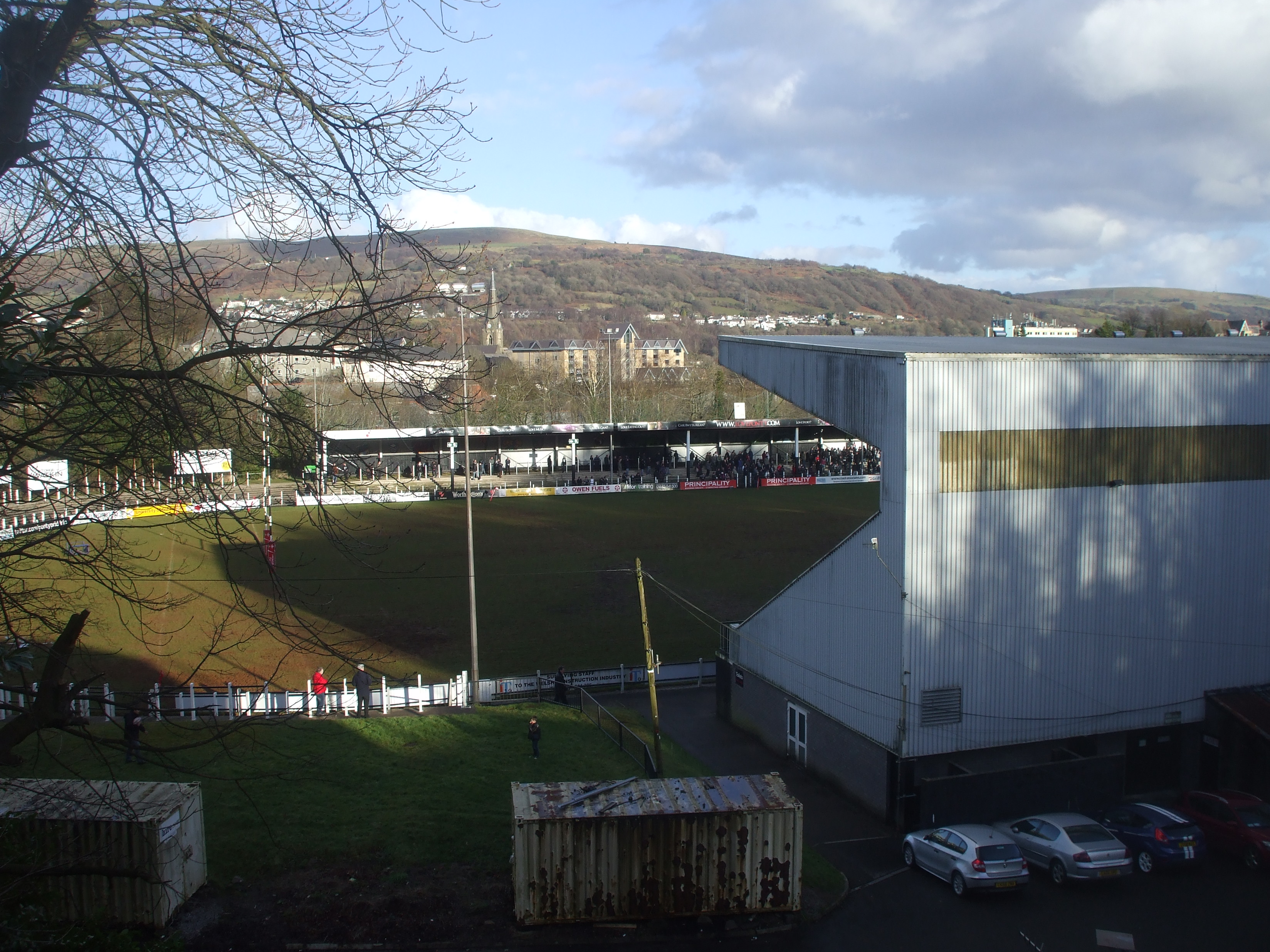
Sardis Road

Pontypridd RFC originally played their games at Taff Vale Park in Treforest, later they moved to the People's Park before finally moving to the Sardis Road ground. It was officially opened in September 1974 and currently holds 7,861 spectators.

It has been host to Argentina verses Western Samoa in the 1991 Rugby World Cup in which Argentina lost 12–35.

The Celtic Warriors used Sardis Road between 2003–2004, however with their demise, Pontypridd RFC have become a semi-professional club and Sardis Road has been mooted as being too big for the crowds that attend their matches. A planning application for a retail store on the Sardis Road ground was turned down by the National Assembly for Wales. The owners of Sardis Road, Ponty Rugby Limited had hoped to sell the ground to a property developer, Morbaine Limited. It was envisaged that a new 3,000 seater stadium would be funded from the sale of the Sardis Road ground.

In 2009, Sardis Road hosted the Wales versus Ireland rugby league semi-final of the European Cup.

== 1991 Rugby World Cup ==
The following 1991 Rugby World Cup matches were held in the stadium.

Date	Team #1	Result	Team #2	Round	Attendance
13 October 1991	Argentina	0–2	Western Samoa	Pool 3	8,500
