= 1967 New Zealand rugby union tour of Britain, France and Canada =

Summary
P	W	D	L
Total
17	16	1	0
Test match
4	4	0	0
Opponent
P	W	D	L
England
1	1	0	0
Wales
1	1	0	0
France
1	1	0	0
Scotland
1	1	0	0

The 1967 New Zealand rugby union tour of Great Britain, France and Canada was a tour undertaken by the New Zealand national rugby union team (the All Blacks). The series consisted of 17 matches, four of Test status against international opposition. The New Zealand team finished the tour undefeated, the first time they had achieved this in the Northern hemisphere since the 1924–25 Invincible team.

== Tour ==
The 1967 tour was hastily arranged, as New Zealand originally intended to tour South Africa. That was called off due to apartheid issues over the Māori members of the New Zealand side, and Britain was chosen as an alternative. This resulted in difficulties arranging matches against club opposition, a tradition of earlier tours, with non-Test games now played solely against regional teams.

The tour captain was Brian Lochore and the 30-man team was managed by former Kiwis' captain Charles Saxton. The tour began in North America, where the All Blacks played two matches, against British Columbia and Eastern Canada. The tourists then travelled to Great Britain where they faced several regional teams along with two Test matches against England and Wales. This was followed by four matches in France, one against the French national team, before returning to Britain to play three games in Scotland, where they played the final Test of the tour against Scotland. They completed the tour with a return to Wales, beating Monmouthshire and then drawing against an East Wales team, before the final fixture against the Barbarians.

The All Blacks should also have played matches in Ireland, including a test match against Ireland on 16 December but they were forced to cancel this section of the tour because of the 1967 United Kingdom foot-and-mouth outbreak. The Irish government banned them from travelling to Ireland, and the tour schedule was re-arranged. The All Blacks also had to burn all their kit before leaving London at the end of the tour.

== Touring party ==
=== Management ===
- Manager: Charles Saxton
- Assistant manager: Fred Allen
- Captain: Brian Lochore

=== Full backs ===
- Fergie McCormick (Canterbury)

=== Three-quarters ===
- Malcolm Dick (Auckland)
- Bill Birtwistle (Waikato)
- Tony Steel (Canterbury)
- Phil Clarke (Marlborough)
- Grahame Thorne (Auckland)
- Bill Davis (Hawke's Bay)

=== Five-eighths ===
- Ian MacRae (Hawke's Bay)
- Gerald Kember (Wellington)
- Wayne Cottrell (Canterbury)
- Earle Kirton (Otago)
- Mack Herewini (Auckland)

=== Half backs ===
- Chris Laidlaw (Otago)
- Sid Going (North Auckland)

=== Forwards ===
- Ken Gray (Wellington)
- Jack Hazlett (Southland)
- Alister Hopkinson (Canterbury)
- Arthur Jennings (Bay of Plenty)
- Ian Kirkpatrick (Canterbury)
- Brian Lochore (Wairarapa)
- John Major (Taranaki)
- Bruce McLeod (Counties)
- Brian Muller (Taranaki)
- Waka Nathan (Auckland)
- Alan Smith (Taranaki)
- Sam Strahan (Manawatu)
- Kel Tremain (Hawke's Bay)
- Graham Williams (Wellington)
- Murray Wills (Taranaki)
- Colin Meads (King Country)

== Match summary ==
Scores and results list New Zealand's points tally first.

Opposing Team	For	Against	Date	Venue
British Columbia	36	3	14 October	Empire Stadium, Vancouver
Eastern Canada	40	3	18 October	Montreal University Stadium, Montreal
North of England	33	3	25 October	White City, Manchester
Midlands, London and Home Counties	15	3	28 October	Welford Road, Leicester
South of England	16	3	1 November	Memorial Ground, Bristol
England	23	11	4 November	Twickenham, London
West Wales	21	14	8 November	St Helens, Swansea
Wales	13	6	11 November	Cardiff Arms Park, Cardiff
South East France	16	3	15 November	Lyon Stade Municipal, Lyon
France 'B'	32	19	18 November	Stadium Municipal, Toulouse
South West France	18	14	21 November	Bayonne Stade Municipal, Bayonne
France	21	15	25 November	Stade Olympique Yves-du-Manoir, Paris
Combined Scottish Districts	35	14	29 November	The Greenyards, Melrose
Scotland	14	3	2 December	Murrayfield, Edinburgh
Monmouthshire	23	12	6 December	Rodney Parade, Newport
East Wales	3	3	13 December	Cardiff Arms Park, Cardiff
Barbarians	11	6	16 December	Twickenham, London

== Match details ==
=== England ===
4 November 1967

England	11–23	New Zealand
Try: Lloyd (2); Con: Rutherford; Pen: Larter		Try: Birtwistle, Dick, Kirton (2), Laidlaw; Con: McCormick (4)

Twickenham Stadium, London
Attendance: 74,000
Referee: D. C. J. McMahon (Scotland)

Team details

England	New Zealand

England: 15. Don Rutherford 14. Keith Savage 13. Colin McFadyean 12. Bob Lloyd 11. Rodney Webb 10. John Finlan 9. Bill Gittings 1. Tony Horton 2. Bert Godwin 3. Phil Judd (c) 4. Peter Larter 5. John Owen 6. Budge Rogers 7. Bob Taylor 8. George Sherriff

New Zealand: 15. Fergie McCormick 14. Malcolm Dick 13. Bill Davis 12. Ian MacRae 11. Bill Birtwistle 10. Earle Kirton 9. Chris Laidlaw 1. Jazz Muller 2. Bruce McLeod 3. Edward Hazlett 4. Samuel Strahan 5. Colin Meads 6. Graham Williams 7. Kel Tremain 8. Brian Lochore (c)

- Note: This was the very first international rugby union match to be televised in colour.

=== Wales ===
11 November 1967

Wales	6–13	New Zealand
Pen: Gale; Drop: John		Try: Birtwistle; Davis; Con: McCormick (2); Pen: McCormick

National Stadium, Cardiff
Attendance: 58,500
Referee: M. H. Titcomb (England)

Team details

Wales	New Zealand

Wales: 15. Paul James Wheeler 14. Stuart Watkins 13. Billy Raybould 12. Ian Hall 11. Keri Jones 10. Barry John 9. Gareth Edwards 1. Denzil Williams 2. Norman Gale (c) 3. Brian Thomas 4. Max Wiltshire 5. Billy Mainwaring 6. Dennis Hughes 7. John Taylor 8. John Jeffery

New Zealand: 15. Fergie McCormick 14. Malcolm Dick 13. Bill Davis 12. Ian MacRae 11. Bill Birtwistle 10. Earle Kirton 9. Chris Laidlaw 1. Jazz Muller 2. Bruce McLeod 3. Ken Gray 4. Samuel Strahan 5. Colin Meads 6. Graham Williams 7. Kel Tremain 8. Brian Lochore (c)

=== France ===
25 November 1967

France	15–21	New Zealand
Try: Campaes; Pen: Villeprreux (3); Drop: Gachassin		Try: Dick; Going; Kirkpatrick; Steel; Con: McCormick (3); Pen: McCormick

Stade Olympique
Attendance: 30,203
Referee: R. P. Burrell (Scotland)

Team details

France	New Zealand

France: 15. Pierre Villepreux 14. Jean-Michel Capendeguy 13. Claude Dourthe 12. Jean Trillo 11. Andre Campaes 10. Jean Gachassin 9. Marcel Puget 1. Andre Abadie 2. Jean-Michel Cabanier 3. Arnaldo Gruarin 4. Benoit Dauga 5. Alain Plantefol 6. Andre Quilis 7. Christian Carrere (c) 8. Walter Spanghero

New Zealand: 15. Fergie McCormick 14. Malcolm Dick 13. Bill Davis 12. Ian MacRae 11. Anthony Steel 10. Earle Kirton 9. Sid Going 1. Jazz Muller 2. Bruce McLeod 3. Ken Gray 4. Samuel Strahan 5. Colin Meads 6. Graham Williams 7. Ian Kirkpatrick 8. Brian Lochore (c)

=== Scotland ===
2 December 1967

Scotland	3–14	New Zealand
Drop: Chisholm		Try: Davis; MacRae; Con: McCormick; Pen: McCormick (2)

Murrayfield Stadium, Edinburgh
Attendance: 60,000
Referee: K. D. Kelleher (Ireland)

Team details

Scotland	New Zealand

Scotland: 15. Stewart Wilson 14. Sandy Hinshelwood 13. Jock Turner 12. John Frame 11. Bob Keddie 10. David Chisholm 9. Alex Hastie 1. Sandy Carmichael 2. Frank Laidlaw 3. David Rollo 4. Peter Stagg 5. George Mitchell 6. James Fisher (c) 7. Derrick Grant 8. Alasdair Boyle

New Zealand: 15. Fergie McCormick 14. Bill Birtwistle 13. Bill Davis 12. Ian MacRae 11. Anthony Steel 10. Earle Kirton 9. Chris Laidlaw 1. Alister Hopkinson 2. Bruce McLeod 3. Ken Gray 4. Samuel Strahan 5. Colin Meads 6. Graham Williams 7. Kel Tremain 8. Brian Lochore (c)

=== Barbarians ===
16 December 1967

Barbarians	6–11	New Zealand
Try: Lloyd; Drop: Wilson		Try: MacRae; Steel; Con: McCormick; Drop: Kirton

Twickenham
Attendance: 40,000
Referee: M. Joseph (England)

Team details

Barbarians	New Zealand

Barbarians: 15. Stewart Wilson (c) 14. Ken Jones 13. Bob Lloyd 12. Gerald Davies 11. Rodney Webb 10. Barry John 9. Gareth Edwards 1. Howard Norris 2. Frank Laidlaw 3. Tony Horton 4. James Fisher 5. Max Wiltshire 6. Peter Larter 7. Bob Taylor 8. George Sherriff

New Zealand: 15. Fergie McCormick 14. Malcolm Dick 13. Bill Davis 12. Ian MacRae 11. Steel 10. Earle Kirton 9. Chris Laidlaw 1. Jazz Muller 2. Bruce McLeod 3. Ken Gray 4. Samuel Strahan 5. Colin Meads 6. Tremain 7. Nathan 8. Brian Lochore (c)

== Bibliography ==
- Billot, John (1972). All Blacks in Wales. Ferndale: Ron Jones Publications.
- Starmer-Smith, Nigel (1977). The Barbarians. Macdonald & Jane's Publishers. ISBN 0-86007-552-4.
