= 1966–67 Rugby Union County Championship =

England rugby Union competition 1966-67

1966–67 County Championship
- Countries: England
- Champions: Surrey (1st title); Durham County (7th title)

The 1966–67 Rugby Union County Championship was the 67th edition of England's premier rugby union club competition at the time.

Surrey and Durham County were declared joint champions after two drawn matches. For Surrey it was their first ever success while Durham County recorded their seventh title but first since 1909.

== Semi finals ==
| Date | Venue | Team One | Team Two | Score |
|---|---|---|---|---|
| 4 Feb | Hartlepool | Durham County | Leicestershire | 6-3 |
| 4 Feb | Redruth | Cornwall | Surrey | 6-6 |
| 18 Feb | Richmond | Surrey | Cornwall | 14-14 |
| 4 Mar | Redruth | Cornwall | Surrey | 3-14 |

== Final ==
8 April 1967

| Surrey | 14–14 | Durham County |
| Try: Lloyd; Con: Hiller; Pen: Hiller (3) | | Try: Weston, Ranson; Con: Chapman; Drop: Weston, Chapman |

Twickenham
Referee: Mike Titcomb (Gloucestershire)

| Bob Hiller | Harlequins |
| C T Gibbons | London Welsh |
| Bob Lloyd | Harlequins |
| Terry Brooke | Richmond |
| John B H Coker | Harlequins |
| B A Richards | Streatham Croydon |
| R P Lewis | Harlequins |
| Tony Horton | Blackheath |
| Peter L Ostling | Blackheath |
| G C Murray | Harlequins |
| C W Dutson | Wasps |
| G J Patterson | London Welsh |
| Archie J Hendrickse | Rosslyn Park |
| Roger Michaelson (capt) | London Welsh |
| D Richards | London Welsh |

| R A Allison | Metropolitan Police |
| Jim McManners | Durham University |
| A E Chapman | Rosslyn Park |
| John Dee | Hartlepool Rovers |
| John Ranson | Rosslyn Park |
| Mike Weston (capt) | Durham City |
| W Woodward | Hartlepool Rovers |
| T Urwin | North Durham |
| H Lamb | Sunderland |
| M R McKenzie | Durham University |
| K Baggs | West Hartlepool |
| J B Wakefield | Hartlepool Rovers |
| J B Boyd | Sunderland |
| Charlie Hannaford | Durham University |
| P J N Knowles | Durham University |

== Final replay ==
22 April 1967

| Durham County | 0–0 | Surrey |

Hartlepool
Referee: Mike Titcomb (Gloucestershire)

| R A Allison | Metropolitan Police |
| J W Brownlee | Richmond |
| A E Chapman | Rosslyn Park |
| John Dee | Hartlepool Rovers |
| John Ranson | Rosslyn Park |
| Mike Weston (capt) | Durham City |
| W Woodward | Hartlepool Rovers |
| T Urwin | North Durham |
| H Lamb | Sunderland |
| D A Pike | Darlington Grammar School O.B |
| K Baggs | West Hartlepool |
| J B Wakefield | Hartlepool Rovers |
| J B Boyd | Sunderland |
| Charlie Hannaford | Durham University |
| P J N Knowles | City of Derry |

| Bob Hiller | Harlequins |
| C T Gibbons | London Welsh |
| Bob Lloyd | Harlequins |
| Terry Brooke | Richmond |
| John B H Coker | Harlequins |
| B A Richards | Streatham Croydon |
| R P Lewis | Harlequins |
| Tony Horton | Blackheath |
| Peter Ostling | Blackheath |
| G C Murray | Harlequins |
| C S Dutson | Wasps |
| G J Patterson | London Welsh |
| Archie J Hendrickse | Rosslyn Park |
| Roger Michaelson (capt) | London Welsh |
| D Richards | London Welsh |

== See also ==
- English rugby union system
- Rugby union in England
