= 2009–10 British and Irish Cup pool stage =

The 2009-10 British and Irish Cup pool stage is a rugby union tournament to be played during November 2009, February and March 2010.

The twenty four teams were arranged into four pools of six, with each team playing the other team in their pool once and the four pool winners qualifying for the knockout stage.

The following point scoring system was used:

- Four points for a win
- Two points for a draw
- One point for scoring four tries or more in a match
- One point for losing a match by seven or less points

Key to colours
Top team in each group advance to semi-finals

== Pool A ==
Team	P	W	D	L	TF	PF	PA	BP	LB	+/-	Pts
(England) Cornish Pirates	5	4	0	1	13	115	63	2	1	+52	19
(Ireland) Leinster A	5	4	0	1	9	89	65	1	1	+24	18
(Wales) Newport	5	3	1	1	10	81	54	1	1	+27	16
(England) Exeter Chiefs	5	2	0	3	11	79	85	1	1	-6	10
(England) Plymouth Albion	5	1	1	3	5	55	58	0	2	-3	8
(Scotland) Gael Force	5	0	0	5	6	35	129	1	1	-94	2

2009-11-20
19:30

Newport (Wales)	21 – 14	(England) Exeter Chiefs
Tries: Wyatt (2); Con: Wannell (1); Pen: Wannell (3)		Tries: Stubble; Sestaret; Con: Gray (2); Pen:

Rodney Parade

2009-11-21
16:30

Plymouth Albion (England)	13 – 16	(Ireland) Leinster A
Tries: Gibson; Con: Davies; Pen: Davies (2)		Tries: Keatney; Con: Berne; Pen: Berne (3)

The Brickfields

2009-11-22
14:00

Cornish Pirates (England)	29 – 8	(Scotland) Gael Force
Tries: Collins; Jackson; Cattle; Ward; Con: Cook (3); Pen: Cook	report	Tries: Kinloch; Con: Pen: Blair

Mennaye Field
Attendance: 2370

2009-11-27
16:00

Leinster A (Ireland)	12 – 10	(England) Cornish Pirates
Tries: Con: Pen:	report	Tries: Con: Pen:

Donnybrook
Attendance: 520

2009-11-27
19:30

Newport (Wales)	3 – 3	(England) Plymouth Albion
Tries: Con: Pen:		Tries: Con: Pen:

Rodney Parade

2009-11-28
15:00

Exeter Chiefs (England)	15 – 0	(Scotland) Gael Force
Tries: Con: Pen:		Tries: Con: Pen:

Sandy Park

2010-02-12
19:30

Newport (Wales)	v	(Scotland) Gael Force
Tries: Con: Pen:		Tries: Con: Pen:

Rodney Parade

2010-02-13
15:00

Exeter Chiefs (England)	v	(Ireland) Leinster A
Tries: Con: Pen:		Tries: Con: Pen:

Sandy Park

2010-02-13
15:00

Plymouth Albion (England)	9 – 13	(England) Cornish Pirates
Tries: Con: Pen:	report	Tries: Con: Pen:

The Brickfields
Attendance: 2413

2010-02-26
15:00

(Scotland) Gael Force	v	(England) Plymouth Albion
Tries: Con: Pen:		Tries: Con: Pen:

2010-02-27
14:30

Leinster A (Ireland)	v	(Wales) Newport
Tries: Con: Pen:		Tries: Con: Pen:

RDS Arena

2010-02-28
14:00

Cornish Pirates (England)	37 – 14	(England) Exeter Chiefs
Tries: Con: Pen:	report	Tries: Con: Pen:

Mennaye Field
Attendance: 2564

2010-03-06
15:00

Exeter Chiefs (England)	v	(England) Plymouth Albion
Tries: Con: Pen:		Tries: Con: Pen:

Sandy Park

2010-03-07
15:00

Cornish Pirates (England)	26 – 20	(Wales) Newport
Tries: Con: Pen:	report	Tries: Con: Pen:

Mennaye Field
Attendance: 3650

2010-03-10
19:00

Gael Force (Scotland)	v	(Ireland) Leinster A
Tries: Con: Pen:		Tries: Con: Pen:

== Pool B ==
Team	P	W	D	L	TF	PF	PA	+/-	Pts
(Ireland) Munster A	5	5	0	0	14	111	41	+70	22
(England) Bristol	5	4	0	1	16	119	77	+42	18
(England) Nottingham	5	3	0	2	11	81	59	+22	14
(Wales) Neath	5	2	0	3	12	93	98	-5	11
(England) Coventry	5	1	0	4	20	126	144	-18	8
(Scotland) Heriot's	5	0	0	5	8	57	168	-111	1

2009-11-20
19:30

Neath (Wales)	11 - 18	(England) Bristol
Tries: Farrell; Con: Pen: Thomas (2)		Tries: Grieve; Alford; Con: Ashwin (1); Pen: Ashwin (2)

The Gnoll

2009-11-20
19:45

Coventry (England)	13 - 20	(Ireland) Munster A
Tries: Roberts; Merrigan; Con: Pen: Carlisle		Tries: Williams; Coughlan; Gleeson; Nagle; Con: Pen:

Butts Park Arena

2009-11-21
15:00

Heriot's (Scotland)	0 - 5	(England) Nottingham
Tries: Con: Pen:		Tries: Savage; Con: Pen:

Goldenacre

2009-11-27
19:30

Munster A (Ireland)	v	(England) Bristol
Tries: Con: Pen:		Tries: Con: Pen:

Musgrave Park

2009-11-27
19:45

Coventry (England)	v	(Scotland) Heriot's
Tries: Con: Pen:		Tries: Con: Pen:

Butts Park Arena

2009-11-29
14:30

Nottingham (England)	v	(Wales) Neath
Tries: Con: Pen:		Tries: Con: Pen:

Meadow Lane

2010-02-13
15:00

Heriot's (Scotland)	v	(Wales) Neath
Tries: Con: Pen:		Tries: Con: Pen:

Goldenacre

2010-02-13
15:00

Munster A (Ireland)	v	(England) Nottingham
Tries: Con: Pen:		Tries: Con: Pen:

Musgrave Park

2010-02-14
13:00

Bristol (England)	v	(England) Coventry
Tries: Con: Pen:		Tries: Con: Pen:

Memorial Stadium

2010-02-27
14:00

Neath (Wales)	v	(Ireland) Munster A
Tries: Con: Pen:		Tries: Con: Pen:

The Gnoll

2010-02-28
15:00

Bristol (England)	v	(Scotland) Heriot's
Tries: Con: Pen:		Tries: Con: Pen:

Memorial Stadium

2010-02-28
15:00

Nottingham (England)	v	(England) Coventry
Tries: Con: Pen:		Tries: Con: Pen:

Meadow Lane

2010-03-06
14:30

Neath (Wales)	v	(England) Coventry
Tries: Con: Pen:		Tries: Con: Pen:

The Gnoll

2010-03-06
15:00

Munster A (Ireland)	v	(Scotland) Heriot's
Tries: Con: Pen:		Tries: Con: Pen:

Musgrave Park

2010-03-07
15:00

Nottingham (England)	v	(England) Bristol
Tries: Con: Pen:		Tries: Con: Pen:

Meadow Lane

== Pool C ==
Team	P	W	D	L	TF	PF	PA	+/-	Pts
(Ireland) Ulster Ravens	5	4	1	0	22	165	62	+103	21
(England) London Welsh	5	4	0	1	18	137	78	+59	20
(England) Bedford Blues	5	3	0	2	11	92	94	-2	13
(Wales) Aberavon	5	2	0	3	4	51	131	-80	9
(Wales) Llanelli	5	1	1	3	11	106	117	-11	8
(England) Moseley	5	0	0	5	10	69	138	-69	1

2009-11-20
19:15

Llanelli (Wales)	16 - 19	(Wales) Aberavon
Tries: Ford; Con: Newton; Pen: Newton (3)		Tries: Pritchard; Con: Jarvis; Pen: Jarvis (4)

Parc y Scarlets

2009-11-20
19:30

Moseley (England)	27 - 38	(England) London Welsh
Tries: Bressington; Simpson-Daniel (2); Thirlby; Con: Thirlby (2); Pen: Roberts		Tries: Garvey; Claasens; Lewis-Pratt; Brown; Stevenson; Con: Lewis-Pratt (5); Pen: Lewis-Pratt

Billesley Common

2009-11-20
19:30

Ulster A (Ireland)	29 - 3	(England) Bedford Blues
Tries: Seymour; Fitzpatrick; Horua; Kyriacou; Con: O'Connor (3); Pen: O'Connor		Tries: Con: Pen: Davies

Ravenhill

2009-11-27
19:15

Aberavon (Wales)	v	(England) London Welsh
Tries: Con: Pen:		Tries: Con: Pen:

Talbot Athletic Ground

2009-11-27
19:30

Moseley (England)	v	(Ireland) Ulster A
Tries: Con: Pen:		Tries: Con: Pen:

Billesley Common

2009-11-28
15:00

Bedford Blues (England)	v	(Wales) Llanelli
Tries: Con: Pen:		Tries: Con: Pen:

Goldington Road

2010-02-12
19:30

Aberavon (Wales)	v	(England) Moseley
Tries: Con: Pen:		Tries: Con: Pen:

Talbot Athletic Ground

2010-02-13
14:00

London Welsh (England)	v	(England) Bedford Blues
Tries: Con: Pen:		Tries: Con: Pen:

Old Deer Park

2010-02-13
15:00

Llanelli (Wales)	v	Ulster A (Ireland)
Tries: Con: Pen:		Tries: Con: Pen:

Parc y Scarlets

2010-02-26
19:00

Ulster A (Ireland)	v	(England) London Welsh
Tries: Con: Pen:		Tries: Con: Pen:

Ravenhill

2010-02-27
14:00

Bedford Blues (England)	v	(Wales) Aberavon
Tries: Con: Pen:		Tries: Con: Pen:

Goldington Road

2010-02-27
15:00

Llanelli (Wales)	v	(England) Moseley
Tries: Con: Pen:		Tries: Con: Pen:

Parc y Scarlets

2010-03-05
19:45

Moseley (England)	v	(England) Bedford Blues
Tries: Con: Pen:		Tries: Con: Pen:

Billesley Common

2010-03-06
14:00

London Welsh (England)	v	(Wales) Llanelli
Tries: Con: Pen:		Tries: Con: Pen:

Old Deer Park

2010-03-12
19:00

Ulster A (Ireland)	v	(Wales) Aberavon
Tries: Con: Pen:		Tries: Con: Pen:

Ravenhill

== Pool D ==
Team	P	W	D	L	TF	PF	PA	+/-	Pts
(England) Doncaster Knights	5	5	0	0	7	163	58	+105	25
(Wales) Cardiff	5	4	0	1	4	147	124	+23	19
(England) Rotherham Titans	5	2	0	3	3	147	127	+20	12
(Scotland) Ayr	5	2	0	3	1	132	111	+21	11
(Wales) Pontypridd	5	2	0	3	1	99	124	-25	10
(England) Birmingham & Solihull	5	0	0	5	1	76	220	-144	1

2009-11-20
19:15

Pontypridd (Wales)	16 - 22	(Wales) Cardiff
Tries: Ballar; Con: Flanagan; Pen: Flanagan; Gunter (2)		Tries: Howell (2); Sweet; Con: Davies (2); Pen: Davies

Cardiff Arms Park*

2009-11-21
14:00

Rotherham Titans (England)	52 - 10	(England) Birmingham & Solihull
Tries: Skurr (2); Henderson (2); Voisey; Rhodes; Burrows; Con: West (3); Rhodes (1); Pen: West (3)		Tries: Hunt; Con: McLean; Pen: Patson

Clifton Lane

2009-11-22
15:00

Doncaster Knights (England)	32 - 7	(Scotland) Ayr
Tries: Tonga'uiha; Planchant; Williams; Warnock; Con: Warnock (3); Pen: Warnock (2)		Tries: Adair; Con: Stewart; Pen:

Castle Park

- The round one game between Pontypridd RFC and Cardiff RFC, was played at Cardiff's home ground, due to Pontypridd's pitch being unplayable.*

2009-11-27
19:30

Pontypridd (Wales)	v	(England) Doncaster Knights
Tries: Con: Pen:		Tries: Con: Pen:

Sardis Road

2009-11-27
20:00

Ayr (Scotland)	v	(England) Rotherham Titans
Tries: Con: Pen:		Tries: Con: Pen:

Millbrae

2009-11-28
14:00

Birmingham & Solihull (England)	v	(Wales) Cardiff
Tries: Con: Pen:		Tries: Con: Pen:

Sharmans Cross

2010-02-13
15:00

Ayr (Scotland)	v	(England) Birmingham & Solihull
Tries: Con: Pen:		Tries: Con: Pen:

Millbrae

2010-02-13
15:00

Doncaster Knights (England)	v	(Wales) Cardiff
Tries: Con: Pen:		Tries: Con: Pen:

Castle Park

2010-02-13
15:00

Rotherham Titans (England)	v	(Wales) Pontypridd
Tries: Con: Pen:		Tries: Con: Pen:

Clifton Lane

2010-02-27
15:00

Ayr (Scotland)	v	(Wales) Pontypridd
Tries: Con: Pen:		Tries: Con: Pen:

Millbrae

2010-02-27
15:00

Cardiff (Wales)	v	(England) Rotherham Titans
Tries: Con: Pen:		Tries: Con: Pen:

Cardiff Arms Park

2010-02-28
15:00

Doncaster Knights (England)	v	(England) Birmingham & Solihull
Tries: Con: Pen:		Tries: Con: Pen:

Castle Park

2010-03-06
14:30

Cardiff (Wales)	v	(Scotland) Ayr
Tries: Con: Pen:		Tries: Con: Pen:

Cardiff Arms Park

2010-03-06
15:00

Birmingham & Solihull (England)	v	(Wales) Pontypridd
Tries: Con: Pen:		Tries: Con: Pen:

Sharmans Cross

2010-03-06
15:00

Rotherham Titans (England)	v	(England) Doncaster Knights
Tries: Con: Pen:		Tries: Con: Pen:

Clifton Lane

== See also ==
- 2009-10 British and Irish Cup
