= 2009–10 Cornish Pirates season =

2009–10 Cornish Pirates Rugby season
- Nickname(s): The Pirates
- Founded: 1945
- Location: Penzance, Cornwall
- Ground(s): Recreation Ground, Camborne
- Coach(es): Chris Stirling, Harvey Biljon and Ian Davies
- Captain(s): Gavan Cattle
- League(s): 2009–10 RFU Championship
- 6th

Official website
- cornish-pirates.com

The 2009–10 season is the Cornish Pirates 7th season in the second tier of the English rugby union league system, the RFU Championship and their first in the British and Irish Cup. The Pirates finished 6th in Stage One of the Championship, allowing them to qualify for the promotion stages, where they finished 3rd and did not qualify for the semi–finals. They also won the final of the British and Irish Cup beating Munster A 23–14.

== Pre–season Friendlies ==
	Date	Opponents	H / A	Result	Score	Attendance	Notes
1	15 August 2009	Cardiff	H	W	60–13	2403	
2	29 August 2009	Harlequins	A	L	17–47		

== RFU Championship ==
=== Stage one matches ===
Stage one is a league programme of 22 matches starting on Saturday 6 September 2009 and completed by Saturday 13 March 2010 (originally due to finish by Saturday 25 February). Each team play 11 matches at home and 11 away with the top eight teams qualifying for the promotion play–offs and bottom four play in the relegation play–off.

	Date	Opponents	H / A	Result	Score	Attendance	Notes
1	6 September 2009	Nottingham Rugby	A	W	24–13	1230	
2	13 September 2009	Moseley	H	W	57–24	2632	
3	18 September 2009	Doncaster Knights	A	W	21–10	1728	
4	27 September 2009	Coventry	H	W	20–14	2695	
5	3 October 2009	Plymouth Albion	A	L	8–16	4004	
6	11 October 2009	Bristol	H	L	13–35	4115	
7	17 October 2009	London Welsh	A	L	10–34	1980	
8	27 October 2009	Birmingham & Solihull	H	W	62–10	2530	
9	31 October 2009	Rotherham Titans	A	L	20–29	1287	
10	8 November 2009	Bedford Blues	H	W	25–24	2465	
11	14 November 2009	Exeter Chiefs	A	L	15–22	6158	
12	5 December 2009	Moseley	A	W	20–19	901	
13	13 December 2009	Doncaster Knights	H	L	10–12	2667	
14	18 December 2009	Coventry	A	W	27–12	1000	
15	27 December 2009	Plymouth Albion	H	W	46–7	5654	
16	1 January 2010	Bristol	A	L	15–31	7740	
	10 January 2009	London Welsh	H		P–P		
17	17 January 2010	Birmingham Solihull	A	D	31–31	916	Played at Camborne due to bad weather in the Birmingham area
18	24 January 2010	Rotherham Titans	H	W	29–24	2459	
19	30 January 2010	Bedford	A	L	16–19	2817	
20	7 February 2010	Exeter Chiefs	H	L	15–30	3661	
21	21 February 2010	Nottingham Rugby	H	W	47–19	2321	
22	13 March 2010	London Welsh	H	L	24–28	1560	

=== Stage one league table ===
2009–10 RFU Championship table
Pos	Team	Pld	W	D	L	PF	PA	PD	B	Pts	Qualification
1	Bristol	22	19	0	3	630	337	+293	16	92	Promotion playoffs
2	Exeter Chiefs	22	19	0	3	699	360	+339	12	88	Promotion playoffs
3	London Welsh	22	14	1	7	483	376	+107	9	62 (Note: 5 points deducted)	Promotion playoffs
4	Bedford Blues	22	12	1	9	581	436	+145	9	59	Promotion playoffs
5	Nottingham	22	12	0	10	539	520	+19	11	59	Promotion playoffs
6	Cornish Pirates	22	11	1	10	555	463	+92	9	55	Promotion playoffs
7	Doncaster Knights	22	10	0	12	394	386	+8	8	48	Promotion playoffs
8	Plymouth Albion	22	10	1	11	389	462	−73	6	48	Promotion playoffs
9	Moseley	22	10	0	12	444	543	−99	6	46	Relegation playoffs
10	Rotherham Titans	22	7	0	15	451	520	−69	15	43	Relegation playoffs
11	Coventry	22	5	1	16	346	565	−219	5	12 (Note: 15 points deducted)	Relegation playoffs
12	Birmingham & Solihull	22	0	1	21	293	836	−543	4	−9	Relegation playoffs

Updated to match(es) played on 13 March 2010. Source:
Rules for classification: If teams are level at any stage, tiebreakers are applied in the following order:
1. Number of matches won
2. Difference between points for and against
3. Total number of points for
4. Aggregate number of points scored in matches between tied teams
5. Number of matches won excluding the first match, then the second and so on until the tie is settled
  Notes:

=== Stage two matches ===
	Date	Opponents	H / A	Result	Score	Attendance	Notes
1	19 March 2010	Bristol	A	L	12–19	5892	
2	28 March 2010	Plymouth Albion	H	W	17–0	2849	
3	4 April 2010	Bedford Blues	H	W	22–18	3359	
4	10 April 2010	Bedford Blues	A	L	18–42	2599	
5	16 April 2010	Plymouth Albion	A	L	14–19	4141	
6	1 May 2010	Bristol	H	L	15–60	3190	

=== Stage two league table ===
Pos	Team	Played	Won	Draw	Lost	For	Against	Bonus Pts	PTS
1	Bristol	6	5	0	1	189	86	4	24
2	Bedford Blues	6	4	0	2	154	125	4	20
3	Cornish Pirates	6	2	0	4	98	158	2	10
4	Plymouth Albion	6	1	0	5	57	129	1	5

== British and Irish Cup ==
	Date	Opponents	H / A	Result	Score	Attendance	Notes
1	22 November 2009	Gael Force	H	W	29–8	2370	
2	27 November 2009	Leinster A	A	L	10–12	520	Played at Donnybrook, Dublin
3	13 February 2010	Plymouth Albion	A	W	13–9	2413	
4	28 February 2010	Exeter Chiefs	H	W	37–14	2564	
5	7 March 2010	Newport	H	W	26–20	3650	

Team	P	W	D	L	TF	PF	PA	BP	LB	+/-	Pts
(England) Cornish Pirates	5	4	0	1	13	115	63	2	1	+52	19
(Ireland) Leinster A	5	4	0	1	9	89	65	1	1	+24	18
(Wales) Newport	5	3	1	1	10	81	54	1	1	+27	16
(England) Exeter Chiefs	5	2	0	3	11	79	85	1	1	-6	10
(England) Plymouth Albion	5	1	1	3	5	55	58	0	2	-3	8
(Scotland) Gael Force	5	0	0	5	6	35	129	1	1	-94	2

=== Semi–final ===
25 April 2010
1500

Cornish Pirates	43 – 5	Doncaster Knights
	report

Recreation Ground, Camborne
Attendance: 2327
Referee: L Roberts (RFU)

=== Final ===
2010
1800

Cornish Pirates (England)	23 – 14	Munster A (Ireland)
	report

Recreation Ground, Camborne
Attendance: 4240
Referee: L Hodges (Wales)

== See also ==
- 2009–10 RFU Championship
- 2009–10 British and Irish Cup
- 2009–10 British and Irish Cup pool stage
