= Max Wiltshire =

Welsh rugby union player (1938–2021)

- Born: Maxwell Lloyd Wiltshire; 16 July 1938 Milsom Point, Australia
- Died: 19 September 2021 (aged 83)
- School: Rhydhir Lower Comprehensive
- Occupation(s): oil process worker taxi driver

Rugby union career
- Position: Lock
Amateur team(s)
Years	Team	Apps	(Points)
- Vardre RFC
–	Skewen RFC		
–	BP Llandarcy RFC		
–	Aberavon RFC		
–	Bridgend RFC		
–	Barbarian F.C.		
International career
Years	Team	Apps	(Points)
1967–1968	Wales	4	(0)
Coaching career
- Years: Team
- BP Llandarcy RFC

Maxwell Lloyd Wiltshire (16 July 1938 – 19 September 2021) was a Welsh international rugby union player. He played as a lock forward for Aberavon RFC during the 1960s.

First capped against the touring All Blacks in 1967 along with fellow Aberavon players, Billy Mainwaring, Ian Hall and Paul James Wheeler he won four Welsh caps.

He captained Aberavon in the 1965–66 & 1966–67 seasons.
