= 1970–71 Rugby Union County Championship =

English rugby union competition

1970–71 County Championship
- Countries: England
- Champions: Surrey (2nd title)
- Runners-up: Gloucestershire

The 1970–71 Rugby Union County Championship was the 71st edition of England's premier rugby union club competition at the time. It would be the last season when the competition was viewed as the premier club competition because the following season would see the introduction of a National Knockout Competition.

Surrey won their second title after defeating Gloucestershire in the final.

== First Round ==
| Pos | Northern Group | P | W | D | L | F | A | Pts |
|---|---|---|---|---|---|---|---|---|
| 1 | Northumberland | 5 | 5 | 0 | 0 | 65 | 34 | 10 |
| 2 | Lancashire | 5 | 4 | 0 | 1 | 90 | 41 | 8 |
| 3 | Cheshire | 5 | 2 | 0 | 3 | 73 | 70 | 4 |
| 4 | Yorkshire | 5 | 2 | 0 | 3 | 51 | 51 | 4 |
| 5 | Durham | 5 | 1 | 0 | 4 | 22 | 50 | 2 |
| 6 | Cumberland & Westmorland | 5 | 1 | 0 | 4 | 44 | 99 | 2 |

| Pos | Midland Group | P | W | D | L | F | A | Pts |
|---|---|---|---|---|---|---|---|---|
| 1 | Warwickshire + | 5 | 4 | 0 | 1 | 49 | 27 | 8 |
| 2 | Leicestershire | 5 | 4 | 0 | 1 | 70 | 46 | 8 |
| 3 | North Midlands | 5 | 3 | 1 | 1 | 54 | 36 | 7 |
| 4 | East Midlands | 5 | 1 | 1 | 3 | 41 | 70 | 3 |
| 5 | Staffordshire | 4 | 1 | 0 | 3 | 35 | 40 | 2 |
| 6 | Notts, Lincs & Derby | 4 | 0 | 0 | 4 | 29 | 59 | 0 |

+ Won play off

| Pos | South East Group | P | W | D | L | F | A | Pts |
|---|---|---|---|---|---|---|---|---|
| 1 | Surrey | 5 | 5 | 0 | 0 | 99 | 26 | 10 |
| 2 | Middlesex | 5 | 4 | 1 | 0 | 69 | 41 | 8 |
| 3 | Eastern Counties | 5 | 3 | 0 | 2 | 86 | 52 | 6 |
| 4 | Kent | 5 | 2 | 0 | 3 | 55 | 80 | 4 |
| 5 | Hampshire | 5 | 1 | 0 | 4 | 55 | 92 | 2 |
| 6 | Sussex | 5 | 0 | 0 | 5 | 32 | 105 | 0 |

| Pos | South-West Group | P | W | D | L | F | A | Pts |
|---|---|---|---|---|---|---|---|---|
| 1 | Gloucestershire | 3 | 3 | 0 | 0 | 32 | 11 | 6 |
| 2 | Devon | 3 | 2 | 0 | 1 | 47 | 29 | 4 |
| 3 | Cornwall | 3 | 1 | 0 | 2 | 25 | 34 | 2 |
| 4 | Somerset | 3 | 0 | 0 | 3 | 14 | 44 | 0 |

| Pos | Southern Group | P | W | D | L | F | A | Pts |
|---|---|---|---|---|---|---|---|---|
| 1 | Dorset & Wilts | 4 | 4 | 0 | 0 | | | 8 |
| 2 | Berkshire | 4 | 1 | 2 | 1 | | | 4 |
| 3 | Buckinghamshire | 4 | 2 | 0 | 2 | | | 4 |
| 4 | Oxfordshire | 4 | 1 | 1 | 2 | | | 3 |
| 5 | Hertfordshire | 4 | 0 | 1 | 3 | | | 1 |

== Second Round ==
| Date | Venue | Team One | Team Two | Score |
|---|---|---|---|---|
| 9 Jan | Bristol | Gloucestershire | Dorset & Wilts | 18-3 |

== Semi finals ==
| Date | Venue | Team One | Team Two | Score |
|---|---|---|---|---|
| 23 Jan | Gosforth | Northumberland | Gloucestershire | 6-9 |
| 20 Feb | Twickenham | Surrey | Warwickshire | 11-9 |

== Final ==
6 March 1971

| Gloucestershire | 3–14 | Surrey |
| Pen: Stephens | | Try: McHarg, Novak; Con: Hiller; Pen: Hiller; Drop: Wright (2) |

Kingsholm, Gloucestershire
Referee: R F Johnson (Kent)

| 15 | Eric Stephens | Gloucester |
| 14 | Peter Knight | Bristol & St Luke's College |
| 13 | Pat Simmons | Rosslyn Park |
| 12 | Des Diamond | Loughborough College |
| 11 | Mike Collins | Bristol |
| 10 | Jonathan Gabitass | Bristol |
| 9 | John Spalding | Gloucester |
| 1 | Robin Cowling | Gloucester |
| 2 | John Pullin | Bristol |
| 3 | Barry Nelmes | Bristol |
| 4 | Alan Brinn | Gloucester |
| 5 | N A Jackson | Gloucester |
| 6 | Charlie Hannaford | Bristol |
| 7 | Dick Smith | Gloucester |
| 8 | Dave Rollitt (capt) | Bristol |

| 15 | Bob Hiller (capt) | Harlequins |
| 14 | R C Cunis | Rosslyn Park |
| 13 | C T Gibbons | London Welsh |
| 12 | Bob Lloyd | Harlequins |
| 11 | John Novak | Harlequins |
| 10 | Ian Wright | Northampton |
| 9 | Nigel Starmer-Smith | Harlequins |
| 1 | Paddy Hinton | Richmond |
| 2 | B Russell | Richmond |
| 3 | Mike Roberts | London Welsh |
| 4 | Alastair McHarg | London Scottish |
| 5 | Geoff Evans | London Welsh |
| 6 | A M Phillips | London Welsh |
| 7 | John Taylor | London Welsh |
| 8 | Mervyn Davies | London Welsh |

== See also ==
- English rugby union system
- Rugby union in England
