= British and Irish Cup =

Annual rugby union competition

- Sport: Rugby union
- Instituted: 2009; 16 years ago
- Inaugural season: 2009–10
- Ceased: 2018; 7 years ago
- Number of teams: 20–32
- Nations: England; Ireland; Scotland; Wales; Jersey
- Holders: (England) Ealing Trailfinders (2017-18)
- Most titles: (Ireland) Leinster A (Ireland) Munster A (2 titles)
- Related competition: RFU Championship; Pro14

The British and Irish Cup was an annual rugby union competition for second tier, semi-professional clubs and the reserves or developing teams from professional clubs from Great Britain and Ireland. It took place for the first time in the 2009–10 season, and ran for 9 seasons.

After clubs from the English Championship decided to withdraw from the 2018–19 season, the competition was abolished. The Welsh and Irish rugby unions thereafter reinstituted the Celtic Cup competition for its development sides.

Leinster A and Munster A were the most successful sides in the competition, winning the trophy twice each. Five English clubs shared the remaining competition wins.

== Format ==
A total of twenty-four teams from England (twelve), Ireland (three), Scotland (three) and Wales (six) competed in the inaugural competition. This remained the case for the first three seasons, though the format varied slightly in each season. For the 2012–13 season, the competition was expanded to 32 teams; England (twelve), Ireland (four), Scotland (four), and Wales (twelve) and for the first time, pool stage games were played on a "home and away" basis. For the 2013–14 season the number of teams competing was reduced to 24, with the Welsh entrants reduced from twelve to four, and the following season the competition was reduced to twenty teams with the withdrawal of the Scottish clubs.

From the 2015–16 season to its end in 2018, Wales was represented by regional Premiership Select sides from the four Welsh regions.

== Finals ==
Year	Winner	Score	Runner-up	Venue	Attendance
2009–10	Cornish Pirates (England)	23 – 14	(Ireland) Munster A	Recreation Ground, Camborne	4,240
2010–11	Bristol (England)	17 – 14	(England) Bedford Blues	Memorial Ground, Bristol	4,375
2011–12	Munster A (Ireland)	31 – 12	(Wales) Cross Keys	Musgrave Park, Cork	3,000
2012–13	Leinster A (Ireland)	18 – 17	(England) Newcastle Falcons	Kingston Park, Newcastle	3,838
2013–14	Leinster A (Ireland)	44 – 17	(England) Leeds Carnegie	Donnybrook, Dublin	2,024
2014–15	Worcester Warriors (England)	35 – 5	(England) Doncaster Knights	Castle Park, Doncaster	3,115
2015–16	London Welsh (England)	33 – 10	(England) Yorkshire Carnegie	Headingley Stadium, Leeds	3,107
2016–17	Munster A (Ireland)	29 – 28	Jersey Reds	Irish Independent Park, Cork	983
2017–18	Ealing Trailfinders (England)	22 – 7	(Ireland) Leinster A	Trailfinders Sports Ground, London	1,386

== Teams ==
Country	Team	2009-10	2010-11	2011-12	2012-13	2013-14	2014-15	2015-16	2016-17	2017-18
(England)	Bedford Blues	✓	✓	✓	✓	✓	✓	✓	✓	✓
(England)	Birmingham & Solihull	✓	✓							
(England)	Bristol Bears	✓	✓	✓	✓	✓	✓	✓		✓
(England)	Cornish Pirates	✓	✓	✓	✓	✓	✓	✓	✓	✓
(England)	Coventry	✓								
(England)	Doncaster Knights	✓	✓	✓	✓		✓	✓	✓	✓
(England)	Ealing Trailfinders					✓		✓	✓	✓
(England)	Esher		✓	✓						
(England)	Exeter Chiefs	✓								
(Jersey)	Jersey Reds (Note: Jersey Reds are listed in the English section because they play in the English RFU Championship.)				✓	✓	✓	✓	✓	✓
(England)	Leeds Tykes			✓	✓	✓	✓	✓	✓	✓
(England)	London Irish								✓	
(England)	London Scottish			✓	✓	✓	✓	✓	✓	✓
(England)	London Welsh	✓	✓	✓		✓		✓	✓	
(England)	Moseley	✓	✓	✓	✓	✓	✓	✓		
(England)	Newcastle Falcons				✓					
(England)	Nottingham	✓	✓	✓	✓	✓	✓	✓	✓	✓
(England)	Plymouth Albion	✓	✓	✓	✓	✓	✓			
(England)	Richmond								✓	✓
(England)	Rotherham Titans	✓	✓	✓	✓	✓	✓	✓	✓	✓
(England)	Worcester Warriors		✓				✓			
(Wales)	Aberavon	✓		✓	✓	✓	✓			
(Wales)	Cardiff	✓			✓					
(Wales)	Llanelli	✓	✓	✓	✓	✓				
(Wales)	Neath	✓	✓	✓	✓					
(Wales)	Newport	✓	✓		✓					
(Wales)	Pontypridd	✓	✓	✓	✓	✓	✓			
(Wales)	Llandovery		✓		✓					
(Wales)	Swansea		✓	✓	✓					
(Wales)	Cross Keys			✓	✓	✓	✓			
(Wales)	Bedwas				✓					
(Wales)	Bridgend Ravens				✓					
(Wales)	Carmarthen Quins				✓		✓			
(Wales)	Cardiff Blues Premiership Select							✓	✓	✓
(Wales)	Dragons Premiership Select							✓	✓	✓
(Wales)	Ospreys Premiership Select							✓	✓	✓
(Wales)	Scarlets Premiership Select							✓	✓	✓
(Scotland)	Ayr	✓	✓	✓		✓				
(Scotland)	Gael Force	✓								
(Scotland)	Heriot's FP	✓								
(Scotland)	Currie		✓	✓						
(Scotland)	Melrose		✓	✓	✓					
(Scotland)	Dundee HSFP				✓					
(Scotland)	Gala				✓	✓				
(Scotland)	Stirling County				✓	✓				
(Scotland)	Edinburgh Academicals					✓				
(Ireland)	Connacht Eagles				✓	✓	✓	✓	✓	✓
(Ireland)	Leinster A	✓	✓	✓	✓	✓	✓	✓	✓	✓
(Ireland)	Munster A	✓	✓	✓	✓	✓	✓	✓	✓	✓
(Ireland)	Ulster A	✓	✓	✓	✓	✓	✓	✓	✓	✓

== History ==
=== 2009–10 Competition ===
The inaugural competition was contested by 24 teams:

- 12 teams from the RFU Championship, the second tier of English rugby
- 3 Irish provinces represented by 'A' teams
- 3 Scottish sides, 2 top clubs from the Scottish Premiership and Gael Force, a side made up of a combination of National Academy players
- 6 top clubs from the Principality Premiership, the second tier of Welsh rugby.

The teams were divided into four pools of six, playing over five weekends during the Autumn International and Six Nations windows, with semi-finals on 24 and 25 April and the final on 16 May.

Each team played each of the other five teams in its pool once (home or away). Two English teams (Cornish Pirates and Doncaster) and two Irish teams (Munster A and Ulster Ravens) topped their respective pools leading to an all-English semi-final and an all-Irish semi-final. Cornish Pirates defeated Munster A in the inaugural final.

Semi-finals
25 April 2010 - Camborne
(England) Cornish Pirates	43
(England) Doncaster	5
24 April 2010 - Thomond Park
(Ireland) Munster A	27
(Ireland) Ulster Ravens	3

Final
16 May 2010 - Camborne
(England) Cornish Pirates	23
(Ireland) Munster A	14

=== 2010–11 Competition ===
The allocation of teams for the second season was very similar to that of the first:

- 12 teams from the RFU Championship, the second tier of English rugby
- 3 Irish provinces represented by 'A' teams
- 3 top clubs from the Scottish Premiership, the second tier of Scottish rugby
- 6 top clubs from the Principality Premiership, the second tier of Welsh rugby.

The format closely mirrored that of the first season, the only difference being the introduction of a quarter final stage

The teams were divided into four pools of six, playing over five weekends during the Autumn International and Six Nations windows, with quarter-finals on 5 or 6 March, semi-finals on 23 April and the final on 7 May. Each team played each of the other five teams in its pool once (home or away), with the top two teams in each pool qualifying for the knock-out stages:

Quarter-finals
5 March 2011 - Sardis Road
(Wales) Pontypridd	12
(Wales) Llanelli	10
6 March 2011 - Memorial Stadium
(England) Bristol	29
(Scotland) Ayr	19
5 March 2011 - Goldington Road
(England) Bedford Blues	50
(Ireland) Leinster A	15
5 March 2011 - Sixways Stadium
(England) Worcester Warriors	57
(England) Moseley	15

Semi-finals
23 April 2011 - Sardis Road
(Wales) Pontypridd	25
(England) Bristol	36
23 April 2011 - Goldington Road
(England) Bedford Blues	43
(England) Worcester Warriors	27

Final
7 May 2011 - Memorial Stadium
(England) Bristol	17
(England) Bedford Blues	14

=== 2011–12 Competition ===
The allocation of teams for the third season was identical to that of the second season:

- 12 teams from the RFU Championship, the second tier of English rugby
- 3 Irish provinces represented by 'A' teams
- 3 top clubs from the Scottish Premiership, the second tier of Scottish rugby
- 6 top clubs from the Principality Premiership, the second tier of Welsh rugby.

The pool stage saw a change in format and consisted of six pools of four teams playing cross-pool matches, giving each team two home and two away matches. Matches between English teams were played mid-week. Pool matches took place from 21 September to 18 December. The top team from each pool qualified for the quarter-finals, together with the two runners–up with the best records.

Quarter-finals
22 January 2012 – Donnybrook
(Ireland) Leinster A	32
(Wales) Pontypridd	0
20 January 2012 – Ravenhill
(Ireland) Ulster Ravens	9
(Ireland) Munster A	20
21 January 2012 – Pandy Park
(Wales) Cross Keys	32
(Wales) Llanelli	8
22 January 2012 – Mennaye Field
(England) Cornish Pirates	33
(England) Nottingham	3

Semi-finals
6 April 2012 – RDS
(Ireland) Leinster A	29
(Ireland) Munster A	36
7 April 2012 – Pandy Park
(Wales) Cross Keys	20
(England) Cornish Pirates	16

Final
27 April 2012 – Musgrave Park
(Ireland) Munster A	31
(Wales) Cross Keys	12

=== 2012–13 Competition ===
The competition was considerably revamped, with expansion from 24 to 32 teams playing each other home and away in the pool stages (previously, pool matches were played home or away). The allocation of teams for the fourth season was therefore:

- 12 teams from the RFU Championship, the second tier of English rugby
- 4 Irish provinces represented by 'A' teams
- 4 top clubs from the Scottish Premiership, the second tier of Scottish rugby
- 12 clubs from the Principality Premiership, the second tier of Welsh rugby.

The pool stage saw a considerable change in format and consisted of eight pools of four teams, giving each team three home and three away matches. Pool matches took place on the same weekends as the Heineken and Amlin Cups. The top team from each pool qualified for the quarter-finals.

The final round of pool matches, due to be played on the weekend of 18/19/20 January, was considerably disrupted. Of 16 matches, 7 were postponed: Connacht Eagles v Newport was not played until 27 April, the weekend of the semi-finals.

Quarter-finals
6 April 2013 - Goldington Road
(England) Bedford Blues	32
(Wales) Llanelli	18
5 April 2013 - Kingston Park
(England) Newcastle Falcons	72
(England) Nottingham	17
7 April 2013 - Mennaye Field
(England) Cornish Pirates	9
(Ireland) Munster A	10
7 April 2013 - Memorial Stadium
(England) Bristol	26
(Ireland) Leinster A	30

Semi-finals
27 April 2013 - Goldington Road
(England) Bedford Blues	15
(England) Newcastle Falcons	18
26 April 2013 - Garryowen FC
(Ireland) Munster A	15
(Ireland) Leinster A	17

Final
17 May 2013 – Kingston Park
(England) Newcastle Falcons	17
(Ireland) Leinster A	18

=== 2013–14 Competition ===
The number of teams playing in the fifth competition was reduced from 32 to 24, with a reduction of Welsh teams from twelve to four:

- 12 teams from the RFU Championship, the second tier of English rugby
- 4 Irish provinces represented by 'A' teams
- 4 top clubs from the Scottish Premiership, the second tier of Scottish rugby
- 4 clubs from the Principality Premiership, the second tier of Welsh rugby.

The twelve Principality Premiership Teams participated in regional play-offs which saw Aberavon, Cross Keys, Llanelli, and Pontypridd qualify for the competition proper.

The pool stage consisted of six pools of four teams, giving each team three home and three away matches. The top team from each group qualified for the quarter-finals, along with two runners-up with the best playing records. The ranking criteria of the quarter-finalists has been altered slightly from earlier seasons. Previously, the six pool winners were seeded 1-6 and the two runners up as 7 and 8. This meant that the best runners-up were automatically ranked 7 and 8 even if they had a better playing record than some of the teams ranked 1–6. This is no longer the case.

The draw for the knockout stage was carried out on 27 January 2014. The top four seeds (Leinster A, Leeds Carnegie, Cornish Pirates and Bristol) had home advantage in the quarter-finals. On 14 April, it was announced that the final would be played at the home of the winner of the Pontypridd / Leinster A semi-final. This game ended as a 22 all draw after extra time; Leinster won on tries scored (3 – 1). Leinster A beat Leeds Carnegie 44 – 17 in the final and retained the cup they won in the previous season – the first team to win the cup for a second time.

Quarter-finals
5 April 2014 – Mennaye Field
(England) Cornish Pirates	14
(Wales) Pontypridd	16
4 April 2014 – Donnybrook
(Ireland) Leinster A	47
(Ireland) Munster A	15
4 April 2014 – Memorial Stadium
(England) Bristol	39
(England) Rotherham Titans	24
4 April 2014 – Headingley
(England) Leeds Carnegie	41
(England) Plymouth Albion	21

Semi-finals
26 April 2014 – Sardis Road (Note: Leinster won on number of tries scored.)
(Wales) Pontypridd	22
(Ireland) Leinster A	22
4 May 2014 – Memorial Stadium
(England) Bristol	25
(England) Leeds Carnegie	30

Final
23 May 2014 – Donnybrook
(Ireland) Leinster A	44
(England) Leeds Carnegie	17

=== 2014–15 Competition ===
The number of teams playing in the sixth competition is reduced from twenty-four to twenty with the withdrawal of the Scottish teams:

- 12 teams from the RFU Championship, the second tier of English rugby
- 4 Irish provinces represented by 'A' teams
- 4 clubs from the Principality Premiership, the second tier of Welsh rugby.

The twelve Principality Premiership Teams participating in regional play-offs which saw Aberavon, Carmarthen Quins, Cross Keys and Pontypridd qualify for the competition proper. The Scottish clubs withdrew because of an increase in the number of the pool matches before Christmas, from four to six. Scottish Rugby felt that Scottish teams would not be able to compete fully in both the British and Irish cup and the BT Premiership; the premier competition for clubs in Scotland.

Quarter-finals
24 January 2015 – Castle Park
(England) Doncaster Knights	38
(Ireland) Munster A	17
23 January 2015 – Ashton Gate
(England) Bristol	41
(England) Yorkshire Carnegie	28
24 January 2015 – Sixways Stadium
(England) Worcester Warriors	24
(Wales) Pontypridd	10
24 January 2015 – Clifton Lane
(England) Rotherham Titans	32
(Ireland) Leinster A	51

Semi-finals
14 March 2015 – Castle Park
(England) Doncaster Knights	27
(England) Bristol	22
13 March 2015 – Sixways Stadium
(England) Worcester Warriors	15
(Ireland) Leinster A	13

Final
3 April 2015 – Castle Park
(England) Doncaster Knights	5
(England) Worcester Warriors	35

=== 2015–16 Competition ===
Remaining with 20 teams.

- (England) – twelve clubs from RFU Championship
- (Ireland) – four Irish provinces represented by 'A' teams
- (Wales) – four Welsh regions represented by Premiership Select teams.

Five pools of 4 teams, with the pool winners and the top three runners up going through to the knockout competition.

Quarter-finals
11 March – Goldington Road
(England) Bedford Blues	15
Jersey	19
12 March – Donnybrook
(Ireland) Leinster A	39
(England) London Welsh	45
13 March – Mennaye Field
(England) Cornish Pirates	38
(England) Doncaster Knights	19
13 March – Headingley
(England) Yorkshire Carnegie	50
(England) Moseley	3

Semi-finals
19 March – Old Deer Park
(England) London Welsh	36
(England) Cornish Pirates	15
20 March – Headingley
(England) Yorkshire Carnegie	33
Jersey	32

Final
10 April – Headingley
(England) Yorkshire Carnegie	10
(England) London Welsh	33
