= 2009–10 British and Irish Cup =

Tournament details
- Countries: England; Ireland; Scotland; Wales
- Tournament format(s): Round-robin and knockout
- Date: November 2009 – May 2010

Tournament statistics
- Teams: 24
- Matches played: 63
- Attendance: 103,545 (1,644 per match)
- Tries scored: 321 (5.1 per match)

Final
- Venue: Recreation Ground, Camborne
- Attendance: 4,240
- Champions: (England) Cornish Pirates (1st title)
- Runners-up: (Ireland) Munster A

The 2009–10 British and Irish Cup was the first season of the annual rugby union competition for second tier, semi-professional clubs from Britain and Ireland. First round matches began on Friday 20 November 2009 and the final was held on Sunday 16 May 2010.

The first competition was heavily criticised, with one reporter describing it as 'dismal'.

A total of 24 teams from England, Ireland, Scotland and Wales competed in the inaugural competition. Cornish Pirates lifted the cup, defeating Munster A 23–14 in the final.

== Teams ==
The allocation of teams was as follows:

- (England) – 12 teams from the RFU Championship
- (Ireland) – 3 Irish provinces represented by 'A' teams
- (Scotland) – 3 Scottish sides, 2 top clubs from the Scottish Premiership and Gael Force, a side made up of a combination of National Academy players
- (Wales) – 6 top clubs from the Principality Premiership

England	Ireland	Scotland	Wales
Bedford Blues; Birmingham & Solihull; Bristol; Cornish Pirates; Coventry; Doncaster; Exeter Chiefs; London Welsh; Moseley; Nottingham; Plymouth Albion; Rotherham	Leinster A; Munster A; Ulster Ravens	Ayr; Heriot's FP; Gael Force	Aberavon; Cardiff; Llanelli; Neath; Newport; Pontypridd

== Competition format ==
The teams were divided into four pools of six, playing over five weekends during the Autumn International and Six Nations windows. The four pool winners contested a knock-out stage, with semi-finals on 24 and 25 April and the final on 16 May.

== Pool stages ==
=== Pool A ===
Team	Pld	W	D	L	PF	PA	PD	T	TB	LB	Pts
(England) Cornish Pirates	5	4	0	1	112	66	+46	15	2	1	19
(Ireland) Leinster A	5	4	0	1	89	65	+24	9	1	1	18
(Wales) Newport	5	3	1	1	81	54	+27	10	1	1	16
(England) Exeter Chiefs	5	2	0	3	82	82	0	12	1	1	10
(England) Plymouth Albion	5	1	1	3	55	58	−3	5	0	2	8
(Scotland) Gael Force	5	0	0	5	35	129	−94	6	1	0	1

Updated to match(es) played on unknown. Source:
Rules for classification: 4 points for a win; 2 points for a draw; 1 bonus point for a loss by seven points or less; 1 bonus point for scoring four or more tries in a match

20 November 2009
19:30

Newport (Wales)	21 – 14	(England) Exeter
	Stats

Rodney Parade
Attendance: 798

21 November 2009
16:30

Plymouth Albion (England)	13 – 16	(Ireland) Leinster A
	Stats

Brickfields Stadium
Attendance: 2,208

22 November 2009
14:00

Cornish Pirates (England)	29 – 8	(Scotland) Gael Force
	Stats

Camborne Recreation Ground
Attendance: 2,370

27 November 2009
16:00

Leinster A (Ireland)	12 – 10	(England) Cornish Pirates
	Stats

Donnybrook
Attendance: 1,670

27 November 2009
19:30

Newport (Wales)	3 – 3	(England) Plymouth Albion
	Stats

Rodney Parade
Attendance: 593

28 November 2009
15:00

Exeter (England)	15 – 0	(Scotland) Gael Force
	Stats

Sandy Park
Attendance: 2,478

12 February 2010
19:30

Newport (Wales)	27 – 5	(Scotland) Gael Force
	Stats

Rodney Parade
Attendance: 705

13 February 2010
15:00

Exeter (England)	10 – 22	(Ireland) Leinster A
	Stats

Sandy Park
Attendance: 3,505

13 February 2010
15:00

Plymouth Albion (England)	9 – 13	(England) Cornish Pirates
	Stats

Brickfields Stadium
Attendance: 2,413

26 February 2010
18:00

Leinster A (Ireland)	6 – 10	(Wales) Newport
	Stats

Donnybrook
Attendance: 780

26 February 2010
19:00

Gael Force (Scotland)	0 – 25	(England) Plymouth Albion
	Stats

Bridgehaugh, Stirling
Attendance: 69

28 February 2010
14:00

Cornish Pirates (England)	34 – 17	(England) Exeter
	Stats

Camborne Recreation Ground
Attendance: 2,564

6 March 2010
15:00

Plymouth Albion (England)	5 – 26	(England) Exeter
	Stats

Brickfields Stadium
Attendance: 2,766

7 March 2010
15:00

Cornish Pirates (England)	26 – 20	(Wales) Newport
	Stats

Camborne Recreation Ground
Attendance: 3,650

10 March 2010
19:00

Gael Force (Scotland)	22 – 33	(Ireland) Leinster A
	Stats

Bridgehaugh, Stirling
Attendance: 300

=== Pool B ===
Team	Pld	W	D	L	PF	PA	PD	T	TB	LB	Pts
(Ireland) Munster A	5	5	0	0	111	41	+70	14	2	0	22
(England) Bristol	5	4	0	1	122	74	+48	14	2	0	18
(England) Nottingham	5	3	0	2	81	59	+22	11	1	1	14
(Wales) Neath	5	2	0	3	93	98	−5	12	2	1	11
(England) Coventry	5	1	0	4	126	144	−18	20	2	2	8
(Scotland) Heriot's FP	5	0	0	5	54	171	−117	7	0	1	1

Updated to match(es) played on unknown. Source:
Rules for classification: 4 points for a win; 2 points for a draw; 1 bonus point for a loss by seven points or less; 1 bonus point for scoring four or more tries in a match

20 November 2009
19:30

Neath (Wales)	11 – 18	(England) Bristol
	Stats

The Gnoll
Attendance: 1,500

20 November 2009
19:45

Coventry (England)	13 – 20	(Ireland) Munster A
	Stats

Butts Park Arena
Attendance: 2,066

21 November 2009
15:00

Heriot's FP (Scotland)	0 – 5	(England) Nottingham
	Stats

Goldenacre
Attendance: 650

27 November 2009
19:30

Munster A (Ireland)	18 – 6	(England) Bristol
	Stats

Nenagh RFC
Attendance: 1,200

27 November 2009
19:45

Coventry (England)	57 – 12	(Scotland) Heriot's FP
	Stats

Butts Park Arena
Attendance: 806

29 November 2009
15:00

Nottingham (England)	14 – 3	(Wales) Neath
	Stats

Meadow Lane
Attendance: 2,087

12 February 2010
19:00

Munster A (Ireland)	18 – 3	(England) Nottingham
	Stats

Waterford RSC
Attendance: 3,500

13 February 2010
14:00

Bristol (England)	40 – 15	(England) Coventry
	Stats

Memorial Stadium
Attendance: 2,461

14 February 2010
14:00

Heriot's FP (Scotland)	21 – 38	(Wales) Neath
	Stats

Goldenacre
Attendance: 500

27 February 2010
14:00

Neath (Wales)	12 – 21	(Ireland) Munster A
	Stats

The Gnoll
Attendance: 1,250

28 February 2010
14:00

Bristol (England)	37 – 14	(Scotland) Heriot's FP
	Stats

Memorial Stadium
Attendance: 2,521

28 February 2010
15:00

Nottingham (England)	43 – 17	(England) Coventry
	Stats

Meadow Lane
Attendance: 1,263

6 March 2010
14:00

Neath (Wales)	29 – 24	(England) Coventry
	Stats

The Gnoll
Attendance: 1,000

7 March 2010
15:00

Nottingham (England)	16 – 21	(England) Bristol
	Stats

Meadow Lane
Attendance: 1,046

12 March 2010
19:30

Munster A (Ireland)	34 – 7	(Scotland) Heriot's FP
	Stats

Musgrave Park

=== Pool C ===
Team	Pld	W	D	L	PF	PA	PD	T	TB	LB	Pts
(Ireland) Ulster Ravens	5	4	1	0	165	62	+103	22	3	0	21
(England) London Welsh	5	4	0	1	137	78	+59	18	3	1	20
(England) Bedford Blues	5	3	0	2	92	94	−2	11	1	0	13
(Wales) Aberavon	5	2	0	3	51	131	−80	4	0	1	9
(Wales) Llanelli	5	1	1	3	106	117	−11	11	1	1	8
(England) Moseley	5	0	0	5	69	138	−69	10	1	0	1

Updated to match(es) played on unknown. Source:
Rules for classification: 4 points for a win; 2 points for a draw; 1 bonus point for a loss by seven points or less; 1 bonus point for scoring four or more tries in a match

20 November 2009
19:15

Llanelli (Wales)	16 – 19	(Wales) Aberavon
	Stats

Parc y Scarlets
Attendance: 600

20 November 2009
19:30

Moseley (England)	27 – 38	(England) London Welsh
	Stats

Billesley Common
Attendance: 563

20 November 2009
19:30

Ulster Ravens (Ireland)	29 – 3	(England) Bedford Blues
	Stats

Ravenhill
Attendance: 1,132

27 November 2009
19:15

Aberavon (Wales)	7 – 36	(England) London Welsh
	Stats

Talbot Athletic Ground
Attendance: 712

27 November 2009
19:30

Moseley (England)	21 – 32	(Ireland) Ulster Ravens
	Stats

Billesley Common
Attendance: 750

28 November 2009
15:00

Bedford Blues (England)	36 – 24	(Wales) Llanelli
	Stats

Goldington Road
Attendance: 2,553

12 February 2010
19:15

Llanelli (Wales)	21 – 21	(Ireland) Ulster Ravens
	Stats

Parc y Scarlets
Attendance: 500

13 February 2010
14:00

London Welsh (England)	26 – 13	(England) Bedford Blues
	Stats

Old Deer Park
Attendance: 810

23 February 2010
19:30

Aberavon (Wales)	10 – 0	(England) Moseley
	Stats

Talbot Athletic Ground
Attendance: 362

26 February 2010
19:30

Ulster Ravens (Ireland)	21 – 17	(England) London Welsh
	Stats

Ravenhill
Attendance: 739

27 February 2010
14:00

Bedford Blues (England)	17 – 15	(Wales) Aberavon
	Stats

Goldington Road
Attendance: 1,230

27 February 2010
14:30

Llanelli (Wales)	35 – 21	(England) Moseley
	Stats

Parc y Scarlets
Attendance: 580

5 March 2010
19:30

Moseley (England)	0 – 23	(England) Bedford Blues
	Stats

Billesley Common
Attendance: 520

6 March 2010
14:00

London Welsh (England)	20 – 10	(Wales) Llanelli
	Stats

Old Deer Park
Attendance: 1,650

12 March 2010
19:30

Ulster Ravens (Ireland)	62 – 0	(Wales) Aberavon
	Stats

Ravenhill
Attendance: 793

=== Pool D ===
Team	Pld	W	D	L	PF	PA	PD	T	TB	LB	Pts
(England) Doncaster	5	5	0	0	163	58	+105	22	5	0	25
(Wales) Cardiff	5	4	0	1	147	124	+23	20	3	0	19
(England) Rotherham	5	2	0	3	147	127	+20	19	3	1	12
(Scotland) Ayr	5	2	0	3	132	111	+21	14	1	2	11
(Wales) Pontypridd	5	2	0	3	99	124	−25	12	1	1	10
(England) Birmingham & Solihull	5	0	0	5	76	220	−144	9	0	1	1

Updated to match(es) played on unknown. Source:
Rules for classification: 4 points for a win; 2 points for a draw; 1 bonus point for a loss by seven points or less; 1 bonus point for scoring four or more tries in a match

20 November 2009
19:15

Pontypridd (Wales)	16 – 22	(Wales) Cardiff
	Stats

Sardis Road
Attendance: 921

21 November 2009
14:00

Rotherham (England)	52 – 10	(England) Birmingham & Solihull
	Stats

Clifton Lane
Attendance: 876

22 November 2009
14:00

Doncaster (England)	32 – 7	(Scotland) Ayr
	Stats

Castle Park
Attendance: 1,496

27 November 2009
20:00

Ayr (Scotland)	28 – 13	(England) Rotherham
	Stats

Millbrae
Attendance: 1,370

28 November 2009
14:00

Birmingham & Solihull (England)	20 – 51	(Wales) Cardiff
	Stats

Sharmans Cross Road
Attendance: 377

13 February 2010
14:00

Rotherham (England)	33 – 23	(Wales) Pontypridd
	Stats

Clifton Lane
Attendance: 789

13 February 2010
16:00

Ayr (Scotland)	49 – 14	(England) Birmingham & Solihull
	Stats

Millbrae
Attendance: 780

14 February 2010
15:00

Doncaster (England)	34 – 10	(Wales) Cardiff
	Stats

Castle Park
Attendance: 1,124

27 February 2010
14:00

Cardiff (Wales)	34 – 27	(England) Rotherham
	Stats

Cardiff Arms Park

27 February 2010
14:00

Doncaster (England)	41 – 8	(England) Birmingham & Solihull
	Stats

Castle Park
Attendance: 783

27 February 2010
15:00

Ayr (Scotland)	21 – 22	(Wales) Pontypridd
	Stats

Millbrae
Attendance: 1,290

3 March 2010
19:30

Pontypridd (Wales)	11 – 24	(England) Doncaster
	Stats

Sardis Road

6 March 2010
14:00

Rotherham (England)	22 – 32	(England) Doncaster
	Stats

Clifton Lane
Attendance: 1,427

6 March 2010
14:30

Birmingham & Solihull (England)	24 – 27	(Wales) Pontypridd
	Stats

Sharmans Cross Road

6 March 2010
14:30

Cardiff (Wales)	30 – 27	(Scotland) Ayr
	Stats

Cardiff Arms Park

== Knock-out stages ==
=== Qualifiers ===
The four pool winners proceeded to the knock out stages.

Grp	Team	Pld	W	D	L	PF	PA	PD	T	TB	LB	Pts
D	(England) Doncaster	5	5	0	0	163	58	+105	22	5	0	25
B	(Ireland) Munster A	5	5	0	0	111	41	+70	14	2	0	22
C	(Ireland) Ulster Ravens	5	4	1	0	165	62	+103	22	3	0	21
A	(England) Cornish Pirates	5	4	0	1	112	66	+46	15	2	1	19

Semi-finals
25 April 2010 - Camborne
(England) Cornish Pirates	43
(England) Doncaster	5
24 April 2010 - Thomond Park
(Ireland) Munster A	27
(Ireland) Ulster Ravens	3

Final
16 May 2010 - Camborne
(England) Cornish Pirates	23
(Ireland) Munster A	14

=== Semi-finals ===
24 April 2010
15:30

Munster A (Ireland)	27 – 3	(Ireland) Ulster Ravens
Try: J Manning (2), D Williams, S Archer; Con: D Cusack (2/4); Pen: D Cusack (1)	Report; Stats	Pen: J McKinney (1)

Thomond Park, Limerick
Attendance: 24,112

25 April 2010
15:00

Cornish Pirates (England)	43 – 5	(England) Doncaster
Try: Davies, Bentley, Morgan, Cattle, Jackson, McGlone; Con: Bently (5/6); Pen: Bently	Report	Try: Armitage

Recreation Ground, Camborne
Attendance: 2,327
Referee: Llyr Ap Geraint Roberts

=== Final ===
16 May 2010
18:00

Cornish Pirates (England)	23 – 14	(Ireland) Munster A
Try: Winn, McAtee; Con: Bentley (2/2); Pen: Bentley (3)	Report; Stats	Try: Barnes; Pen: Cusack (3)

Recreation Ground, Camborne
Attendance: 4,240
Referee: (Wales) Leighton Hodges

== Geography ==
Locations of the 2009-10 British and Irish Cup teams

Team	Stadium	Capacity	City/Area/Country
(Wales) Aberavon	Talbot Athletic Ground	3,000	Aberavon, Neath Port Talbot, Wales
(Scotland) Ayr	Millbrae	Unknown	Alloway, South Ayrshire, Scotland
(England) Bedford Blues	Goldington Road	5,000 (1,700 seats)	Bedford, Bedfordshire, England
(England) Birmingham & Solihull	Sharmans Cross Road	3,500	Solihull, West Midlands, England
(England) Bristol	Memorial Stadium	12,100	Bristol, England
(Wales) Cardiff	Cardiff Arms Park	13,500	Cardiff, Wales
(England) Cornish Pirates	Recreation Ground	9,000	Camborne, Cornwall, England
(England) Coventry	Butts Park Arena	4,000	Coventry, West Midlands, England
(England) Doncaster	Castle Park	3,075	Doncaster, South Yorkshire, England
(England) Exeter Chiefs	Sandy Park	7,300 (10,744 by the end of the season)	Exeter, Devon, England
(Scotland) Gael Force	Bridgehaugh	4,000	Stirling, Scotland
(Scotland) Heriot's FP	Goldenacre	Unknown	Edinburgh, Scotland
(Ireland) Leinster A	Donnybrook	7,000	Dublin, Leinster, Ireland
(Wales) Llanelli	Parc y Scarlets	14,870	Llanelli, Carmarthenshire, Wales
(England) London Welsh	Old Deer Park	5,850 (1,000 seats)	London, England
(England) Moseley	Billesley Common	3,000+ (650 seated)	Birmingham, West Midlands, England
(Ireland) Munster A	Musgrave Park	8,300	Cork, County Cork, Ireland
(Wales) Neath	The Gnoll	7,500	Neath, Neath Port Talbot, Wales
(Wales) Newport	Rodney Parade	10,500	Newport, Wales
(England) Nottingham	Meadow Lane	19,588	Nottingham, Nottinghamshire, England
(England) Plymouth Albion	The Brickfields	6,500	Plymouth, Devon, England
(Wales) Pontypridd	Sardis Road	7,861	Pontypridd, Rhondda Cynon Taf, Wales
(England) Rotherham	Clifton Lane	2,500	Rotherham, South Yorkshire, England
(Ireland) Ulster Ravens	Ravenhill Stadium	12,125	Belfast, Ulster, Northern Ireland
