= Tony Horton =

Tony Horton may refer to:

- Tony Horton (baseball), Major League baseball player
- Tony Horton (personal trainer), developer of the P90X workout system
- Tony Horton (rugby union), England international rugby union footballer
