= Phil Morgan (rugby union) =

Welsh rugby player (1937–1998)

- Full name: Philip Edward James Morgan
- Born: 21 December 1937 Hereford, England
- Died: 9 April 1998 (aged 60) Cardiff, Wales

Rugby union career
- Position: Prop
Senior career
Years	Team	Apps	(Points)
1958–69	Aberavon		
International career
Years	Team	Apps	(Points)
1961	Wales	3	(0)

Philip Edward James Morgan (21 December 1937 — 9 April 1998) was a Welsh international rugby union player.

Born in Hereford, England, Morgan was a Wales Schools representative player and won full international honours for Wales in the 1961 Five Nations Championship, playing three matches as a prop.

Morgan spent his entire playing career with Aberavon, then served the club for eight years as a coach.

== See also ==
- List of Wales national rugby union players
