= Billy Mainwaring =

Wales international rugby union footballer (1941–2019)

- Born: Gwilym Thomas Mainwaring; 24 January 1941 Port Talbot, Wales
- Died: 1 April 2019 (aged 78)
- School: Eastern School, Taibach
- Occupation: steelworker

Rugby union career
- Position: Lock
Amateur team(s)
| Years | Team | Apps | (Points) |
- Taibach RFC
| – | Aberavon RFC | | |
| – | Bridgend RFC | | |
| – | Barbarian F.C. | | |
International career
| Years | Team | Apps | (Points) |
| 1967–1968 | Wales | 7 | (0) |

William Thomas Mainwaring (born Gwilym Thomas Mainwaring; 24 January 1941 – 1 April 2019) was a Welsh international second row rugby union player who played for Aberavon RFC.

== Rugby career ==
Nurtured in his village team of Taibach RFC, Mainwaring was a regular member of the Aberavon RFC team before his first cap in 1966-7 season against Scotland at Murrayfield. He played in all of the Welsh games of that term.

In the following season, he was one of four Aberavon RFC players who played against the touring All Blacks (the others being fellow second row Max Wiltshire, centre Ian Hall and debutant full-back Paul Wheeler). His final test was against England in 1968.

He captained Aberavon RFC in the 1969–70 and 1970-1 seasons playing on until the club's centenary season of 1976-7.

During his career he formed a club second row partnership firstly with Max Wiltshire and later with Allan Martin, both fellow internationals.

After retirement he became a selector at Aberavon RFC. His mother, Evelyn Mainwaring, who died in 2004, was a vociferous supporter of Aberavon; her "often deafening" words of advice and humour delivered from the stand made her popular throughout the rugby fraternity in Wales. On one occasion, when her son got into a fracas with Gareth Edwards, she shouted: "Put him down, Billy, he's playing for Wales on Saturday!"
