= Bob Lloyd (rugby union) =

England international rugby union footballer

- Born: Robert Hoskins Lloyd; 3 March 1943 (age 83) Plympton, Devon, England
- School: Cheltenham College

Rugby union career
- Position: centre
Amateur team(s)
Years	Team	Apps	(Points)
1961	Clifton RFC		
1961 – 1973	Harlequin FC		
–	Hong Kong Football Club		
Provincial / State sides
Years	Team	Apps	(Points)
- Surrey
International career
Years	Team	Apps	(Points)
1967–1968	England	5	(6)

Robert Hoskins Lloyd (born 3 March 1943) is a former rugby union player who played for Clifton RFC, Harlequins, Surrey, Barbarians and the England national rugby union team.

Lloyd was born in Plympton, Devon and spent the early part of his life in Glasgow. He attended Cheltenham College and first played for Clifton in the 1961–62 season after leaving Cheltenham, but only played a few games for the club before joining Harlequins, where he spent the remainder of his rugby career in England.

Lloyd played against the 1967 New Zealand touring team for the Midlands, London & Home Counties at Leicester on 28 October 1967, scoring a try. A week later on 4 November 1967 Lloyd was selected to play for England, making his international debut against New Zealand at Twickenham and scoring two tries as England lost 16–23. He was also invited to play for the Barbarians against New Zealand later that month, scoring a further try, as well as appearing for the Barbarians in the 1967 match against Leicester. Lloyd played in all four England matches of the 1968 Five Nations, which brought his total of England appearances to five. He appeared in the England trial matches in 1969 and toured the Far East with England in 1971 captaining the England team in a non cap match against Japan in the absence of the tour captain Budge Rogers through injury but won no further full caps after 1968. He was selected for the 1968 British Lions tour to South Africa but declined the invitation due to engineering exam commitments.

Lloyd was Harlequins' captain in the 1970–71 and 1971–72 seasons and also represented the Surrey county team, playing in their county championship finals in 1967, when they shared the title with Durham and in 1971, when they beat Gloucestershire 14 – 3 at Kingsholm. His total of 46 appearances for Surrey has been exceeded only by Bob Hiller.

In August 1973 Lloyd emigrated to Hong Kong where he played rugby for the Hong Kong Football Club and captained Hong Kong against Wales in 1975 and the Hong Kong Sevens team in the inaugural Hong Kong Sevens in 1976 during which they won the Plate competition. Lloyd worked for the Hong Kong Government for 30 years until his retirement in 2003. He has since worked with a Hong Kong civil engineering contractor as its Business Development Director and as a Project Manager for a civil engineering consultant until his third retirement at the end of 2015.

Lloyd was inducted into the Harlequins F. C. Hall of Fame in December 2012.

Bob Lloyd was a civil engineer who studied at the Hatfield Polytechnic and is a Fellow of the Institution of Civil Engineers and a Member of the Hong Kong Institution of Engineers.
