= Charlie Saxton (sportsman) =

New Zealand rugby union footballer, coach and administrator, and cricketer

Charlie Saxton MBE
- Full name: Charles Kesteven Saxton
- Born: 23 May 1913 Kurow, New Zealand
- Died: 4 July 2001 (aged 88) Dunedin, New Zealand
- Height: 1.65 m (5 ft 5 in)
- Weight: 67 kg (148 lb)

Rugby union career
- Position: Halfback
Provincial / State sides
Years	Team	Apps	(Points)
1935–1936	Otago		
1937–1938	South Canterbury		
1938–1939	Southland		
International career
Years	Team	Apps	(Points)
1938	New Zealand	3	(9)
- Cricket career

Cricket information
- Batting: Right-handed

Domestic team information
- Years: Team
- 1934/35–1938/39: Otago
- FC debut: 24 December 1934 Otago v Wellington
- Last FC: 31 December 1938 Otago v Auckland

Career statistics
Competition	First-class
Matches	7
Runs scored	226
Batting average	17.38
100s/50s	0/0
Top score	37
Catches/stumpings	3/–
- Source: CricketArchive, 29 December 2023

Charles Kesteven Saxton MBE (23 May 1913 – 4 July 2001) was a New Zealand rugby union and cricket player, coach and administrator.

== Early life ==
Born at Kurow in North Otago, Saxton was educated at Otago Boys' High School in Dunedin, where he was a member of the school's 1st XV rugby team between 1931 and 1932 coached by Jimmy Duncan.

== Rugby union career ==
A halfback, Saxton represented Otago, South Canterbury, and Southland at a provincial level, and was a member of the New Zealand national side, the All Blacks, in 1938. He played seven matches for the All Blacks including three internationals. At the conclusion of World War II he captained the 2nd New Zealand Expeditionary Force "Kiwis" team on their 1945–46 tour of Britain and Europe.

Returning to New Zealand, Saxton coached the Pirates club in Dunedin, and was an assistant coach of the Otago team from 1948 to 1957. In 1967 he managed the All Blacks on their tour of Britain, France and Canada. Saxton served on the council of the New Zealand Rugby Football Union (NZRFU) from 1957 to 1971 and was president of the NZRFU in 1974. He was elected a life member of the NZRFU two years later.

In 1967, Saxton wrote the coaching booklet The ABC of Rugby, which had a print run of 70,000 copies, in conjunction with the NZRFU.

In the 1978 New Year Honours, Saxton was appointed a Member of the Order of the British Empire, for services to rugby.

== Cricket career ==
An opening batsman and occasional wicketkeeper, Saxton played seven first-class games for Otago between the 1934–35 and 1938–39 seasons. He scored 226 runs at an average of 17.38, with a high score of 37, playing in all three of Otago's Plunket Shield matches during 1934–35 and appearing in two Shield matches and against the touring MCC side in the following season. His final first-class match against Auckland was played during 1938–39. He later assisted with coaching Otago between 1948–49 and 1956–57.

== World War II service ==
During World War II, Saxton served with the 19th Armoured Regiment, rising to the rank of major and seeing active service in North Africa and Italy.

== Later life and death ==
Saxton owned and ran a menswear shop in Dunedin for many years. He died at Dunedin in 2001 from complications caused by emphysema at the age of 88. His funeral was held at Carisbrook. In his eulogy, Fred Allen described Saxton as "a New Zealand icon".
