= Roger Michaelson =

- Full name: Roger Carl Brandon Michaelson
- Born: 31 March 1941 (age 85) Porthcawl, Wales
- School: Clifton College
- University: Christ's College, Cambridge

Rugby union career
- Position: No. 8
International career
Years	Team	Apps	(Points)
1963	Wales	1	(0)

Roger Carl Brandon Michaelson (born 31 March 1941) is a Welsh former international rugby union player.

Michaelson was born in Porthcawl and educated in England, at Clifton College and Christ's College, Cambridge.

A number eight, Michaelson captained the Cambridge varsity XV. He also played for Averavon and London Welsh during his career, while winning one Wales cap, in a home loss to England in the 1963 Five Nations Championship.

Michaelson ran a fruit and veg business in Kent for many years.

== See also ==
- List of Wales national rugby union players
