= Griff Williams (rugby union) =

- Full name: Griffith Morgan Williams
- Born: 30 June 1907 Tynewydd, Wales
- Died: 6 April 1991 (aged 83) Skewen, Wales

Rugby union career
- Position: Second row
International career
Years	Team	Apps	(Points)
1936	Wales	3	(0)

Griffith Morgan Williams (30 June 1907 — 6 April 1991) was a Welsh international rugby union player.

A steelworker, Williams was a giant second rower and played some rugby with Aberavon Quins before moving on to Aberavon RFC, where he formed a forward partnership with Wales international Ned Jenkins. He was capped for Wales in all three matches of their championship-winning 1936 Home Nations campaign.

== See also ==
- List of Wales national rugby union players
