= Adrian Clarke (rugby union) =

New Zealand rugby player and politician

- Born: Adrian Hipkins Clarke; 23 February 1938 (age 88) Christchurch, New Zealand
- Height: 1.73 m (5 ft 8 in)
- Weight: 74 kg (163 lb)
- School: Avondale College
- Notable relative: Phil Clarke (brother)
- Occupation(s): Insurance agent Hotel proprietor

Rugby union career
- Position(s): First five-eighth Second five-eighth
Provincial / State sides
Years	Team	Apps	(Points)
	Auckland	51	
International career
Years	Team	Apps	(Points)
1958–1960	New Zealand	3	(0)
- Married to Pauline Innes McDonald (m. 1962)

Adrian Hipkins Clarke (born 23 February 1938) is a former New Zealand rugby union player and politician. He represented the All Blacks from 1958 to 1960, and unsuccessfully stood for the National Party in the Henderson electorate at the 1969 general election.

== Early life and family ==
Clarke was born in Christchurch on 23 February 1938, the son of Hazel Clarke (née Shoesmith) and Vernon Hipkins Clarke. He was educated at Avondale College, Auckland. His younger brother, Phil, also played for the All Blacks.

in 1962, Clarke married Pauline Innes McDonald, and the couple went on to have four daughters: Karen, Michelle, Delwyn and Bridgette.

== Rugby union ==
A first or second five-eighth, Clarke represented Auckland at a provincial level, and was a member of the New Zealand national side, the All Blacks, from 1958 to 1960. He played 14 matches for the All Blacks including three internationals.

== Politics ==
At the 1969 general election, Clarke was the National Party's candidate in the newly formed Henderson electorate. However, he lost to the Labour candidate, Martyn Finlay, by almost 3300 votes.

== Other activities ==
Clarke worked as an insurance agent, and later was proprietor of Waipapakauri Hotel in the Northland settlement of Awanui. He also was the owner of a commercial crayfish boat, and was active in Rotary.
