= Phil Clarke (rugby union) =

New Zealand rugby union player (born 1942)

- Born: Philip Hipkins Clarke; 23 January 1942 (age 84) Oratia, New Zealand
- Height: 1.75 m (5 ft 9 in)
- Weight: 84 kg (185 lb)
- School: Henderson High School
- Notable relative: Adrian Clarke (brother)

Rugby union career
- Position: Wing
Provincial / State sides
| Years | Team | Apps | (Points) |
| 1963 | Canterbury | 9 | |
| 1965–1968 | Marlborough | 28 | |
International career
| Years | Team | Apps | (Points) |
| 1967 | New Zealand | 0 | (0) |

Philip Hipkins Clarke (born 23 January 1942) is a former New Zealand rugby union player. A wing, Clarke represented Canterbury and Marlborough at a provincial level, and was a member of the New Zealand national side, the All Blacks, on their 1967 tour of Britain, France and Canada. He played four matches for the All Blacks on that tour, but did not appear in any of the internationals.

Clarke later coached the Opawa club in Blenheim, and his son, Ben, played representative rugby for Marlborough.
