= Mike Titcomb =

English rugby union referee

Michael Herbert Titcomb (23 April 1933 – 2 May 2008) was a rugby union referee. He became the youngest referee to officiate an international game when Wales faced Scotland in 1966.

Born Bristol, England Titcomb played rugby for both his school and his university, Bristol University. He only took up refereeing after an eye injury ended his playing career. He officiated his first match in Moseley as the substitute referee when the one originally scheduled failed to show. The RFU were impressed by his performance and Titcomb quickly made it to the international ranks.

He officiated five England Trials, three Barbarian fixtures and 26 county matches, including three finals. Several of the matches he refereed are well remembered including when Oxford University beat South Africa 6–3. The most famous moment of his career came in 1968 when he wrongly awarded a drop goal to Gareth Edwards of Wales. With the call it brought the score of the Wales-Ireland international to 6–6. The Irish fans acted with anger to Titcomb's call pelting him with bottles and other missiles as he left the pitch at the end of the game. Titcomb later apologized for his call.

Titcomb died of kidney failure on 2 May 2008.
