= Gerald Kember =

New Zealand rugby union player (1945–2024)

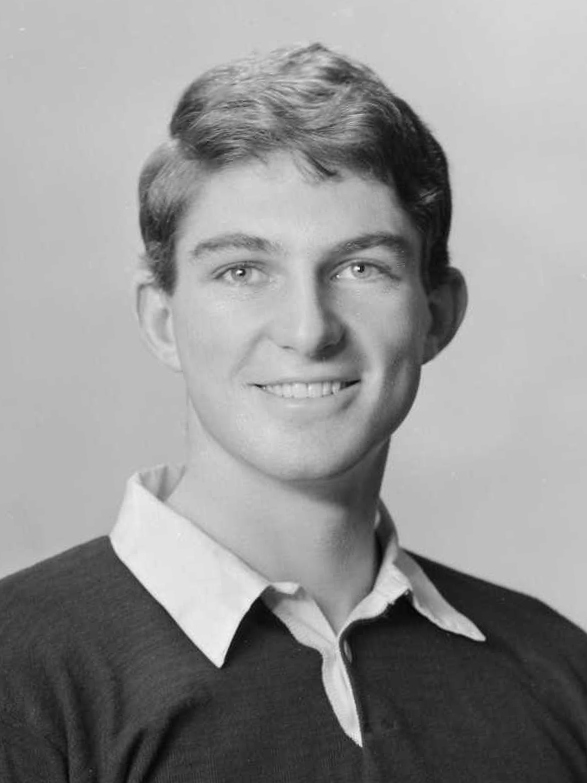
- Kember in 1965
- Born: Gerald Francis Kember; 15 November 1945 Wellington, New Zealand
- Died: 2 October 2024 (aged 78)
- Height: 1.85 m (6 ft 1 in)
- Weight: 86 kg (190 lb)
- School: Nelson College
- University: Victoria University of Wellington
- Occupation: Lawyer

Rugby union career
- Positions: Second five-eighth; fullback
Provincial / State sides
Years	Team	Apps	(Points)
1965–1970	Wellington	44	
International career
Years	Team	Apps	(Points)
1967–1970	New Zealand	1	(14)

Gerald Francis Kember (15 November 1945 – 2 October 2024) was a New Zealand rugby union player. A fullback and second five-eighth, Kember represented Wellington at a provincial level, and was a member of the New Zealand national side, the All Blacks, from 1967 to 1970. He played 19 matches for the All Blacks including one international.

Kember was educated at Nelson College from 1959 to 1963, playing in the 1st XV rugby team in 1962 and 1963, and the 1st XI cricket team from 1960 to 1963. He captained both teams in 1963. Kember died on 2 October 2024, at the age of 78.
