= Bob Keddie (rugby union) =

Scotland international rugby union player

- Born: Robert Ramsay Keddie; 19 July 1945 (age 81) Edinburgh, Scotland
- University: Royal (Dick) School of Veterinary Studies

Rugby union career
- Position: Wing / Centre
Amateur team(s)
Years	Team	Apps	(Points)
- Watsonians
- London Scottish
Provincial / State sides
Years	Team	Apps	(Points)
- Edinburgh District
International career
Years	Team	Apps	(Points)
1967	Scotland	1	(0)

Bob Keddie (born 19 July 1945) is a former Scotland international rugby union player.

== Rugby Union career ==
=== Amateur career ===
He played club rugby for Watsonians.

He went on to play for London Scottish.

=== Provincial career ===
He played for Edinburgh District in the Scottish Inter-District Championship.

=== International career ===
He was capped once for Scotland. He played against the All Blacks on 2 December 1967 at Murrayfield.

He had to withdraw from the Scotland squad in 1968 due to a knee injury.
