= Terry Brooke =

English rugby union player

- Full name: Terence John Brooke
- Born: 8 October 1940 (age 86) Surbiton, Surrey, England
- Height: 6 ft 2 in (188 cm)
- Weight: 90 kg (198 lb)
- School: Purley County Grammar School

Rugby union career
- Position: Centre
International career
| Years | Team | Apps | (Points) |
| 1968 | England | 2 | (0) |

Terence John Brooke (born 8 October 1940) is an English former international rugby union player.

Born in Surbiton, Surrey, Brooke began playing rugby while a Leicester schoolboy. He later attended Purley County Grammar School. After playing first XV rugby with Warlingham, Brooke moved on to Richmond to advance his career.

Brooke, a long-striding, strongly built centre, made two appearances for England during the 1968 Five Nations Championship, a loss to France at Colombes and win over Scotland at Murrayfield.

== See also ==
- List of England national rugby union players
