= Ian Wright (rugby union) =

England international rugby union player

- Full name: Ian Douglas Wright
- Born: 24 December 1945 Croydon, Surrey, England
- Died: 2000 (aged 54) Cheltenham, Gloucestershire

Rugby union career
- Position: Fly-half
International career
Years	Team	Apps	(Points)
1971	England	4	(0)

Ian Douglas Wright (24 December 1945 – 2000) was an English rugby union international.

Wright, known as "Stumpy", was born in Croydon and educated at Worthing Grammar School.

A fly-half, Wright gained four England caps in the 1971 Five Nations Championship. He played his rugby for Northampton and appeared in 251 games for the club from 1969 to 1978, scoring 631 points.

== See also ==
- List of England national rugby union players
