= Paul Wheeler (rugby union) =

- Born: Paul James Wheeler; 5 February 1947 Newport, Wales
- School: Duffryn Grammar
- University: University College, Cardiff

Rugby union career
- Position: Full back
Amateur team(s)
Years	Team	Apps	(Points)
- Aberavon RFC
International career
Years	Team	Apps	(Points)
1967-1968	Wales	2	(0)

James Paul Wheeler (born 5 February 1947) was a Welsh international full back who played club rugby for Aberavon. He won two caps for Wales including one against the 1967 touring New Zealand side.

== International matches played ==
Wales

- England 1968
- New Zealand 1967

== Bibliography ==
- Smith, David; Williams, Gareth (1980). Fields of Praise: The Official History of The Welsh Rugby Union. Cardiff: University of Wales Press. ISBN 0-7083-0766-3.
