= Goldenacre =

Area of Edinburgh, Scotland

Coordinates: 55°58′13.82″N 3°12′30.25″W

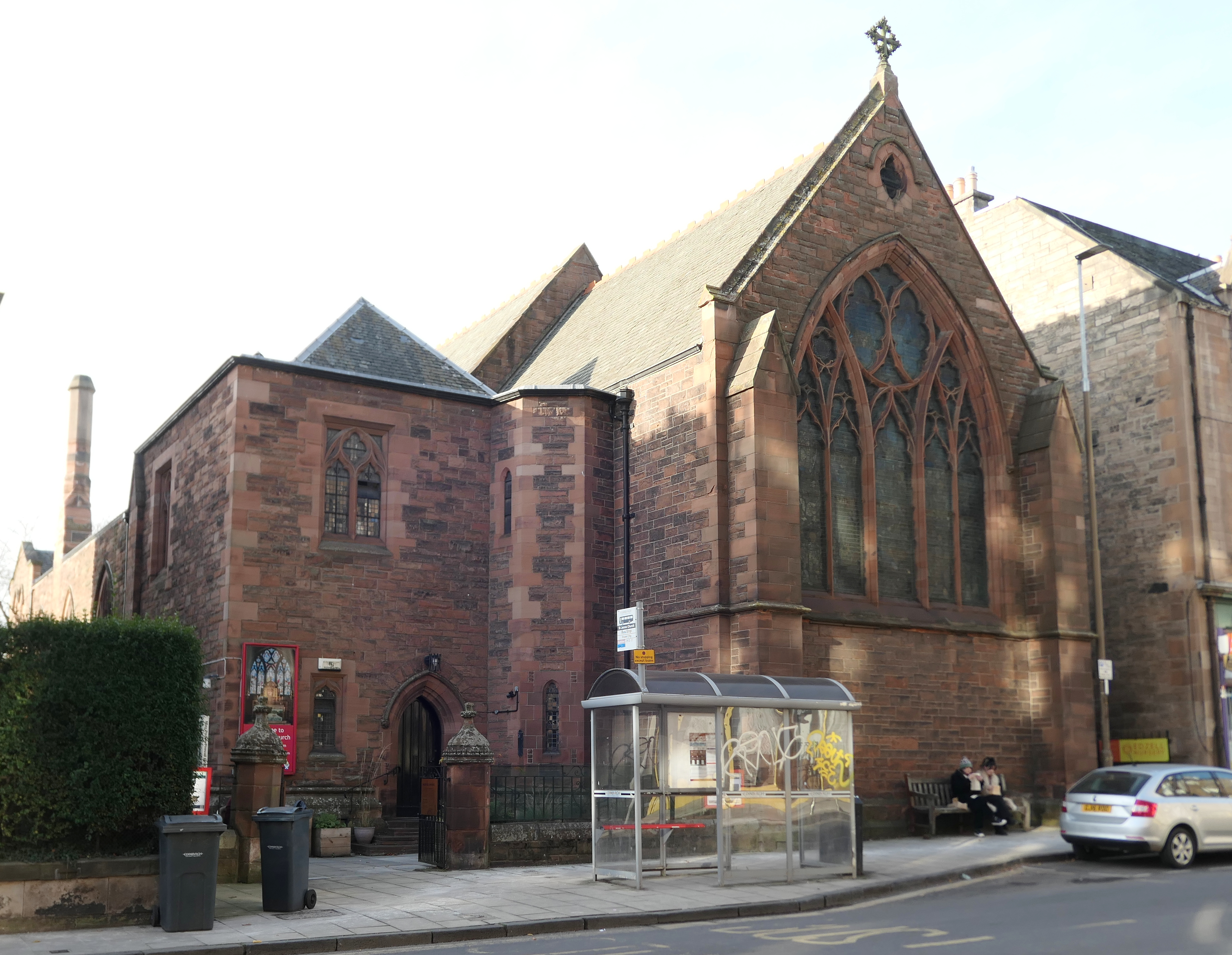
St James's Episcopal Church

Goldenacre is an area in Edinburgh, Scotland, centred on the northern end of Inverleith Row. It lies on and to the south of Ferry Road, which forms the effective boundary with Trinity. It is part of the Inverleith Conservation area and the Stockbridge and Inverleith Community Council area.

The name Goldenacre originally applied only to the land to the east of Inverleith Row, belonging to the Dukes of Buccleuch and developed in the late 19th century, with street-names taken from Buccleuch titles and properties.

== Transport links ==
The area is well-served for local transport, with six bus services provided by Lothian Buses. Destinations include the City Centre, the shopping centre at South Gyle and the Royal Infirmary of Edinburgh at Little France.

== Demographics and facilities ==
The area is considered to be broadly affluent, and is mostly residential with some commercial activity, especially around the junction of Ferry Road with Inverleith Row, such as a newsagent, a fishmonger, a dispensing chemist and an off-licence, plus some more specialist businesses such as Robert Murray Stamp Shop, one of the UK's leading stamp shops. However the three bank branches (Bank of Scotland, Royal Bank of Scotland and TSB) that were previously situated in the area have all recently been closed. There are at least three sheltered housing communities.

St James Goldenacre is a Scottish Episcopal church opened in 1888, designed by Robert Rowand Anderson with painted decoration by William Hole.

Goldenacre Sports Ground, located within the Goldenacre Playing Fields, has played a historic role in the development of Scottish rugby union. The Playing Fields belongs to George Heriot's School, and encompasses field hockey pitches, rugby pitches, cricket nets and a fenced, floodlit court used for tennis and football, amongst other activities. There is a local bowling club, Goldenacre Bowling Club Ltd, and the neighbouring district of Inverleith is home to the Royal Botanic Garden, only a few minutes walk from Goldenacre.

== Works cited ==
- Gifford, John; McWilliam, Colin; Walker, David (1991). Edinburgh. The Buildings of Scotland. Penguin Books. ISBN 978-0-300-09672-9.
