= Ian Hall (rugby union) =

Wales international rugby union footballer

- Born: 4 November 1946 (age 80) Gilfach Goch, Rhondda Cynon Taf, Wales
- Occupation: Retired South Wales Police Inspector

Rugby union career
- Position(s): Centre, Wing
Amateur team(s)
Years	Team	Apps	(Points)
- Pontypridd RFC
–	Aberavon RFC		
–	South Wales Police RFC		
–	Barbarian F.C.		
International career
Years	Team	Apps	(Points)
1967–1974	Wales	8	(0)

Ian Hall (born 4 November 1946) was a Welsh former rugby union international who played club rugby for Aberavon RFC during the 1970s.

Born in Gilfach Goch, Hall was a strong running centre / wing with a great tackle. Capped eight times by his country between 1967 and 1974 he captained Aberavon RFC in the 1971/72 season.

Hall's first cap was against the All Blacks (New Zealand) a week after his 21st birthday.

A police inspector formerly by profession Hall also played for South Wales Police RFC.

After finishing his playing career, Hall moved into coaching where he took control of The Welsh Youth Team, South Wales Police RFC and then Swansea RFC.
