= Gael Force =

Scottish rugby union club

Gael Force was a rugby team formed by the Scottish Rugby Union to play in the British and Irish Cup. The team was formed from the ranks of Celtic League sides Glasgow Warriors and Edinburgh Rugby and from players in the Scottish Rugby Academy.

The other two places allocated to Scotland in the British and Irish Cup were taken by the Scottish Premiership champions and the winners of the Scottish Cup. In the inaugural competition of 2009/2010 these were Heriot's and Ayr.

The national academy coach, Stephen Gemmell was head coach of the team. Home games were played at Bridgehaugh Park, home of Stirling County RFC.
