= Tony Horton (rugby union) =

England international rugby union player (1938–2020)

Anthony Lawrence Horton (13 July 1938 – 9 March 2020) was an England international rugby union player.

Horton was capped seven times as a prop for England between 1965 and 1967 and was selected for the 1968 British Lions tour to South Africa, where he played in three of the four international matches against South Africa.

He played club rugby for Blackheath.
