= Scottish Regional League (rugby union) =

Rugby league

- Sport: Rugby union
- Founded: 2012
- No. of teams: 115
- Country: Scotland
- Most recent champions: West: Greenock Wanderers; Caledonia: Strathmore; East: Berwick

The Scottish Regional Leagues are the lowest levels of the Scottish rugby union system. They consist of three regions:

- West Regional Leagues
- East Regional Leagues
- Caledonia Regional Leagues

Unlike the Premiership, National League and parts of the League Championship, which were formed in 1973 and have remained roughly the same since, the Regional Leagues have grown over time, in a process which saw the old District Leagues amalgamated into the national structure. Up to and including season 2006–07, some divisions operated pools (where the division was split in two, with pre-Christmas and post-Christmas mini-groups) but from season 2007–08 all the divisions will be standard all-play-all formats of between 10 and 12 clubs.

From season 2012–13 the whole League was revamped into a pyramid structure. The 6 National Divisions were scrapped because of travel costs and lack of movement between leagues. The new leagues were:

- 2 national divisions – Premiership and National League
- 2 semi-national (West/East) – Championship Divisions A and B
- 3 regional leagues (East, West and Caledonia)

The Caledonia Leagues were then broken down again into Midlands, North-East and North-West for travel cost reasons. For season 2014–15, Championship divisions A & B were scrapped and two additional National League divisions were re-introduced under National League Division 1.

The champion from each league would be promoted to replace the bottom team of the corresponding division. Also two-legged play-offs were introduced at the end of each season for the 2nd placed team and 2nd bottom team of the higher league. The winner over two legs would play in the higher league the next season, meaning greater potential movement throughout the divisions.

== History ==
Up to season 1972–73, Scotland's rugby union clubs participated in what was known as an 'unofficial championship'. It provided very unbalanced competition: some clubs played more fixtures than others and some fixture lists provided stiffer opposition than others. The resulting league table at the end of each season gave a very unbalanced and difficult-to-comprehend set of results.

Starting in season 1973–74, the Scottish Rugby Union organised the full member clubs into six leagues. Though the SRU's administrators were often seen as backward looking, Scotland had a national league before England, Wales or Ireland. Since the advent of the leagues, the Scottish Rugby Union and its member clubs have re-organised the competition several times, usually to change the number of teams.

The current Regional Leagues are based more on political than physical geography. The Caledonia region covers a much larger area and more clubs but a smaller population. The East region is made up of the City of Edinburgh, the Lothians and the Borders, traditionally the strongest rugby playing regions. The West region is based on the old Strathclyde council region, from the South-West English border, through Ayrshire, Lanarkshire, Glasgow and suburbs North to Stirlingshire. The Caledonia Region covers the whole North of Scotland from Fife and Stirling, all the way to Orkney and Eilean Siar. It is sub-divided (in leagues 2 and 3) into Midlands, North and North-West.

== Tennents West Regional League 2021-2022 ==
In League One, with the exception of Carrick the teams remained the same as the 2019-20 season, due to the covid 19 pandemic. In League Three, the Isle of Mull RFC moved to non-league status.

=== West One ===
- Allan Glen's RFC
- Annan RFC
- Cambuslang RFC
- Carrick
- East Kilbride RFC
- Garnock RFC
- Irvine RFC
- Kilmarnock RFC
- Lenzie RFC
- Stewartry RFC
- Strathendrick RFC

=== West Two ===
- Clydebank RFC
- Cumnock RFC
- Dalziel RFC
- Helensburgh RFC
- Oban Lorne RFC
- Paisley RFC
- Strathaven RFC
- Uddingston RFC
- Waysiders Drumpellier
- Wigtownshire RFC

=== West Three ===
- Birkmyre RFC
- Bishopton RFC
- Cowal RFC
- Clydesdale RFC
- Cumbernauld RFC
- Glasgow University Medics RFC
- Hyndland RFC
- Lanark RFC
- Lochaber RFC
- Loch Lomond RFC
- Moffat RFC
- Shawlands FP RFC

=== Non-League ===
- Bute RFC
- Campbeltown Kintryre
- Colonsay RFC
- Etive Vikings
- HMNB Clyde RFC
- Islay RFC
- Isle of Arran RFC
- Isle of Jura RFC
- Isle of Mull RFC
- Mid Argyll RFC
- Millbrae RFC
- Police Scotland Glasgow

== Caledonia Regional League, 2021–22 ==
2nd and 3rd XVs not included.

=== Caledonia 1 ===
- Aberdeen Wanderers RFC
- Blairgowrie RFC
- Caithness
- Dunfermline RFC
- Ellon RFC
- Garioch RFC
- Glenrothes RFC
- Grangemouth Stags
- Hillfoots RFC
- Orkney RFC

=== Caledonia Midlands 2 ===
- Alloa RFC
- Carnoustie HSFP
- Dundee University Medics RFC
- Harris Academicals RFC
- Kinross RFC
- Madras Rugby
- Panmure

=== Caledonia North 2 ===
- Aberdeenshire RFC
- Banff RFC
- Mackie Academy RFC
- Moray RFC
- North Police Scotland RFC
- Ross Sutherland RFC

=== Caledonia Midlands 3 ===
- Bannockburn RFC
- Crieff and Strathearn RFC
- Dundee Morgan
- Montrose and District RFC
- Rosyth Sharks
- Waid Academy F.P.

=== Caledonia North 3 ===
- Aberdeen University RFC
- Huntly RFC
- Kinloss RFC
- RAF Lossiemouth RFC
- Shetland RFC
- Stornoway RFC

=== Caledonia Midlands 4 ===
- Aberfeldy RFC
- Arbroath RFC
- Bo'ness RFC
- Stobswell RFC

=== Caledonia North 4 ===
- Aberdeen Taexali
- Aberdeen University Medics RFC
- Deeside RFC
- Dyce RFC
- Fraserburgh RFC
- Inverness Craig Dunain RFC
- Peterhead RFC
- Turriff RFC

== East Regional League, 2023–24 ==
=== East One ===
- Broughton RFC
- Forrester RFC
- Haddington RFC
- Leith RFC
- Linlithgow RFC
- Langholm RFC
- Portobello RFC
- Royal HSFP

=== East Two ===
- Corstorphine RFC
- Dalkeith RFC
- Duns RFC
- Dunbar RFC
- Hawick Harlequins
- Hawick Linden RFC
- Livingston RFC
- Penicuik RFC

=== East Three ===
- Earlston RFC
- Edinburgh University Medics RFC
- Edinburgh Northern RFC
- Gala Y.M. RFC
- Inverleith RFC
- Liberton RFC
- Lismore RFC
- Trinity Academicals RFC

=== East Non-League ===
- Eyemouth RFC
- Queensferry RFC
- RDVC RFC
- St Boswells RFC
- Walkerburn RFC
