= 2012–13 Scottish League Championship =

The 2012-13 Scottish League Championship (or 2012-13 RBS Scottish League Championship for sponsorship reasons) was the 39th season of formal domestic rugby union leagues in Scotland. The season was contested between August 2012 and March 2013, with Ayr RFC winning a historic Championship and Cup double.

== Participants ==
=== National ===
==== Premiership ====
- Aberdeen Grammar
- Ayr
- Boroughmuir
- Currie
- Dundee High School FP
- Edinburgh Academicals
- Gala
- Heriot's
- Melrose
- Stirling County

==== National One ====
- Biggar RFC
- Glasgow Hawks
- Hamilton RFC
- Hawick RFC
- Hillhead/Jordanhill RFC
- Jed-Forest RFC
- Kelso RFC
- Selkirk RFC
- Stewart's Melville FP
- Watsonians RFC

=== Championship ===
==== League A ====
- Ardrossan Academicals RFC
- Cartha Queens Park RFC
- Dalziel RFC
- Dunfermline RFC
- Dumfries RFC
- Falkirk RFC
- Greenock Wanderers RFC
- Glasgow Hutchesons Aloysians RFC
- West of Scotland RFC
- Whitecraigs RFC

==== League B ====
- Haddington RFC
- Hawick YM RFC
- Howe of Fife RFC
- Kirkcaldy RFC
- Lasswade RFC
- Morgan Academy RFC
- Murrayfield Wanderers RFC
- Musselburgh RFC
- Peebles RFC
- Perthshire RFC

=== Scottish Regional Leagues ===
There are three Regions: West, East and Caledonia. These have been formed over time from the old system of independent District leagues.

=== West Regional League, 2012-2013 ===
==== One ====
- Allan Glen's RFC
- Annan RFC
- East Kilbride RFC
- Glasgow High Kelvinside
- Glasgow Academicals RFC
- Irvine RFC
- Marr RFC
- Newton Stewart RFC
- Stewartry RFC
- Waysiders Drumpellier

Details:

==== Two ====
- Cambuslang RFC
- Clydebank RFC
- Cumbernauld RFC
- Helensburgh RFC
- Lenzie RFC
- Oban Lorne RFC
- Strathaven RFC
- Strathendrick RFC
- Uddingston RFC
- Wigtownshire RFC

Details:

==== Three ====
- Birkmyre RFC
- Carrick RFC
- Clydesdale RFC
- Cumnock RFC
- Isle of Mull RFC
- Jordanhill Phoenix RFC
- Loch Lomond RFC
- McLaren RFC
- Milbrae RFC
- Paisley RFC

Details:

==== Four ====
- Bishopton RFC
- Braidholm RFC
- Cowal RFC
- Hyndland RFC
- Isle of Arran RFC
- Lanark RFC
- Mid Argyll RFC
- Moffat RFC
- Renfrew RFC
- Strathclyde Police RFC

Details:

=== East Regional League, 2012-2013 ===
==== One ====
- Berwick RFC
- Dunbar RFC
- Duns RFC
- Langholm RFC
- Linlithgow RFC
- Livingston RFC
- North Berwick RFC
- Portobello RFC
- Preston Lodge RFC
- RHC RFC

Details:

==== Two ====
- Dalkeith RFC
- Earlston RFC
- Edinburgh Northern RFC
- Forrester RFC
- Gala YM RFC
- Hawick Harlequins RFC
- Hawick Linden RFC
- Lismore RFC
- Ross High RFC
- Trinity Academicals RFC

Details:

==== Three ====
- Broughton RFC
- Inverleith RFC
- Leith Academicals RFC
- Liberton RFC
- Moray House RFC
- Penicuik RFC
- Queensferry RFC
- Royal Dick Veterinary College RFC
- St Boswells RFC
- Walkerburn RFC

Details:

=== Caledonia Regional League, 2012-2013 ===
==== One ====
- Aberdeen University RFC
- Aberdeenshire
- Caithness RFC
- Glenrothes RFC
- Gordonians RFC
- Highland RFC
- Hillfoots RFC
- Mackie Academy RFC
- Orkney RFC
- Strathmore RFC

Details:

==== Three Midlands ====
- Arbroath RFC
- Bannockburn RFC
- Bridgehaugh RFC
- Crieff & Strathearn RFC
- Montrose & District RFC
- Panmure RFC
- Stobswell RFC
- Waid Academy FPRFC

Details:

==== Two Midlands ====
- Alloa RFC
- Blairgowrie RFC
- Carnoustie HSFP
- Fife Southern RFC
- Grangemouth Stags
- Harris Academy RFC
- Kinross RFC
- Madras College FP RFC
- St Andrews University RFC

Details:

==== Three Northeast ====
- Aberdeen Wanderers 2nds
- Deeside RFC
- Dyce RFC
- Ellon 2nds
- Garioch 2nds
- Gordonians 2nds
- Huntly RFC
- Mackie 2nds

Details:

==== Two North ====
- Aberdeen Wanderers RFC
- Aberdeenshire 2nds
- Banff RFC
- Garioch RFC
- RAF Lossiemouth RFC
- Ross Sutherland RFC
- Lochaber RFC
- Moray RFC

Details:

==== Three Northwest ====
- Highland Reds
- Inverness Craig Dunain RFC
- Moray 2nds
- Ross Sutherland 2nds
- Stornoway RFC
- Strathspey RFC

Details:
