= Grampian Alliance League =

- Sport: Rugby union
- Founded: ?
- No. of teams: 5
- Country: Scotland
- Most recent champion: Gordonians 2nd XV

The Grampian Alliance League was a small rugby union competition participated in by clubs (including some 2nd XVs) in the Grampian region. Together with the Highland Alliance League, it was one of the few remaining leagues not part of the Scottish rugby union system, and therefore neither it nor its clubs were part of the Scottish League Championship structure.

During season 2006-2007 it was in an unclear position - inside the League Championship, being known as Grampian Division and at the same level as the Midlands and North sections of the Caledonia Regional Leagues - but containing the 2nd XVs of Aberdeen Wanderers RFC, Aberdeenshire RFC and Mackie Academy RFC. 2nd XVs are not usually permitted in the League Championship.

However, for the 2007-2008 season two of the first team clubs - Aberdeen University RFC and Aboyne RFC, who had finished 1st and 2nd during 2006-2007 - joined the North section of the Caledonian Regional Leagues. This left West Dyce RFC and Peterhead RFC, who had finished bottom of the 7-team division in 2006-2007, on their own along with the three 2nd XVs - although Gordonians RFC 2nd XV replaced Aberdeenshire RFC, 2nd XV. The league was renamed the Aberdeen & District League for the 2010-11 season. All teams in this new league were merged into the newly expanded Scottish Regional Leagues and will compete in the 2011-12 season in the Caledonia Regional League division three northeast.

== Aberdeen & District League, 2010-2011 ==
- Aberdeen Wanderers 2nd XV
- Dyce RFC
- Gordonians 2nd XV
- Mackie Academy FP 2nd XV
- Peterhead RFC

Details:
