= Scottish Club Youth Competitions =

- Countries: Scotland
- Date: August – December 2015
- Matches played: 10 matches

The Scottish Club Youth Competitions conference structures established for the 2015–16 season group clubs based on the development structures they have in place, the volume of teams they operate and results over recent seasons. The fixture programmes arranged by Scottish Rugby will guarantee blocks of 'club v club' fixtures in the autumn phase of the season.

== History ==
In December 2013 Scottish Rugby launched its strategic initiative ‘Youth Rugby – A strategy for Schools’. Former Scotland rugby coach Frank Hadden conducted the review for Scottish Rugby.

In recent years youth rugby has had many changes in competition structure mainly based on the needs and wants of participating teams, some teams have thrived, some teams have struggled but change has been a constant and it is obvious that the current structure continues to be affected by; withdrawal of teams from leagues, weather, lack of competitive fixtures for some teams, a disjointed approach to fixturing, a reluctance by some to play on a regular basis. There is no doubt that the structure for youth rugby has reached a point where a radical change in approach is required to bring stability to our game.

== The President’s Conference ==
2015 The President's Conference
Team	Location
Ayr	Ayr
Boroughmuir	Edinburgh
Currie	Edinburgh
Highland	Inverness
Stirling County	Stirling
West of Scotland	Milngavie

Teams fielded:

- U18
- U16
- S3 (U15)
- S2 (U14)
- S1 (U13)
Scottish Club Youth Competitions (Scotland)

== Central Belt Conferences ==
=== Green Conference ===
2015 Green Conference
Team	Location
Biggar	Biggar
Dumfries Saints	Dumfries
Dunfermline	Dunfermline
Falkirk	Falkirk
GHA	Glasgow
Hamilton	Hamilton
Whitecraigs	Newton Mearns

Teams fielded:

- U18
- U16
- S3 (U15)
- S2 (U14)
- S1 (U13)
Scottish Club Youth Competitions (Scotland)
Scottish Club Youth Competitions (South Lanarkshire)

=== Brown Conference ===
2015 Brown Conference
Team	Location
Allan Glens	Glasgow
Cumnock	Cumnock
Dalziel	Motherwell
East Kilbride	East Kilbride
Greenock Wanderers	Greenock
Livingston	Livingston

Teams fielded:

- U18
- U16
- S3 (U15)
- S2 (U14)
- S1 (U13)
Scottish Club Youth Competitions (Scotland)
Scottish Club Youth Competitions (Glasgow council area)

== Caledonia Conferences ==
2015 Caledonia Conference (Red)
Team	Location
Aberdeen Grammar	Aberdeen
Deeside / Wanderers	Aberdeen
Ellon	Ellon
Gordonstoun School	Elgin
Mackie	Stonehaven
Perthshire	Perth

Teams fielded:

- U18
- U16
- S3 (U15)
- S2 (U14)
- S1 (U13)
Scottish Club Youth Competitions (Scotland)

2015 Caledonia North Conference
Team	Location
Orkney	Orkney
Huntly/Moray	Elgin
Ross Sutherland	Invergordon
Stornoway	Stornoway
Caithness	Caithness
Garioch	Inverurie

Teams fielded:

- U18
- U16
- S3 (U15)
- S1/S2 (U14)
Scottish Club Youth Competitions (Scotland)
