= Highland Alliance League =

- Sport: Rugby union
- Founded: ?
- No. of teams: 8
- Country: Scotland
- Most recent champion: RAF Lossiemouth 2009-10

The Highland Alliance League, was a small rugby union competition participated in by clubs (including some 2nd XVs) in the far north of Scotland. Together with the Grampian Alliance League, it was one of the few remaining leagues not part of the Scottish rugby union system until 2011.

It was not contested during 2006-2007, although Stornoway RFC did participate in the Brin Cup, a 2nd XV tournament.

== Highland Alliance League, 2010-11 ==
- Inverness Craig Dunain RFC
- Stornoway RFC
- Highland RFC, 2nd XV
- RAF Lossiemouth RFC
- RAF Kinloss RFC
- Lochaber RFC
- Moray RFC
- Strathspey RFC

== Previous Competitors ==
- Caithness RFC, 2nd XV, 2007-08 Season

Details:
