= Rugby union in Scotland =

Popular team sport

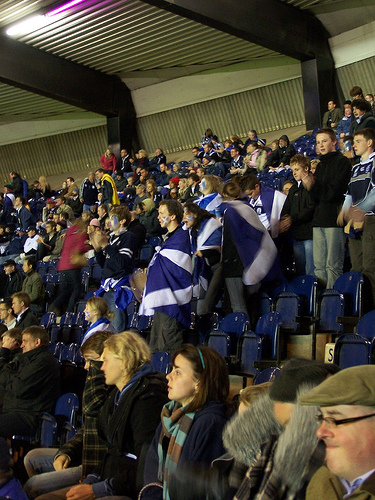
- Scottish fans watching a game against Romania at the 2007 Rugby World Cup
- Country: Scotland
- Governing body: Scottish Rugby Union
- National team: Scotland
- First played: 1858, Edinburgh
- Registered players: 38,500
- Clubs: 143 full member clubs and an additional 135 associate member clubs (system)

National competitions
- Rugby World Cup; Six Nations; Rugby World Cup Sevens; World Rugby Sevens Series; Edinburgh 7s

Club competitions
- United Rugby Championship; European Rugby Champions Cup; European Rugby Challenge Cup; League Championship; Scottish Cup; Borders Sevens Circuit

Rugby union in Scotland is a popular team sport. Scotland's national side today competes in the annual Six Nations Championship and the Rugby World Cup. The first ever international rugby match was played on 27 March 1871, at Raeburn Place in Edinburgh, when Scotland defeated England in front of 4,000 people. Professional clubs compete in the United Rugby Championship, European Rugby Champions Cup and European Rugby Challenge Cup, while the Scottish League Championship exists for over 200 amateur and semi-professional clubs, as does a knock-out competition, the Scottish Cup. The governing body, the Scottish Rugby Union (SRU), is one of the ten first-tier member nations of World Rugby.

== Governing body ==
The governing body of the game in Scotland is the Scottish Rugby Union (SRU), who operate the Scottish national team.

== History ==
=== Early history ===
There is a long tradition of "football" games in Scotland, and many of these such as Jeddart Ball bear more resemblance to rugby than association football, since passing and carrying by hand play a large part in them. The Kirkwall Ba game still takes place, and involves scrummaging. Scottish soccer enthusiasts also cite these games as ancestral to their sport.

There is evidence for schoolboys playing a "football" ball game in Aberdeen in 1633 (some references cite 1636) which is notable as an early allusion to what some have considered to be passing the ball. The word "pass" in the most recent translation is derived from "huc percute" (strike it here) and later repercute pilam (strike the ball again) in the original Latin. It is not certain that the ball was being struck between members of the same team. The original word translated as "goal" is metum, literally meaning the "pillar at each end of the circus course" in a Roman chariot race. There is a reference to "get hold of the ball before [another player] does" (Praeripe illi pilam si possis agere) suggesting that handling of the ball was allowed. One sentence states in the original 1930 translation "Throw yourself against him" (Age, objice te illi). It is clear that the game was rough and tackles allowed included the "charging" and pushing/holding of opposing players ("drive that man back" in the original translation, "repelle eum" in original Latin). It has been suggested that this game bears similarities to rugby football.

Contrary to media reports in 2006 there is no reference to forward passing, game rules, marking players or team formation. These reports described it as "an amazing new discovery" but has actually been well documented in football history literature since the early 20th century and available on the internet since at least 2000.

=== 1800s–present ===
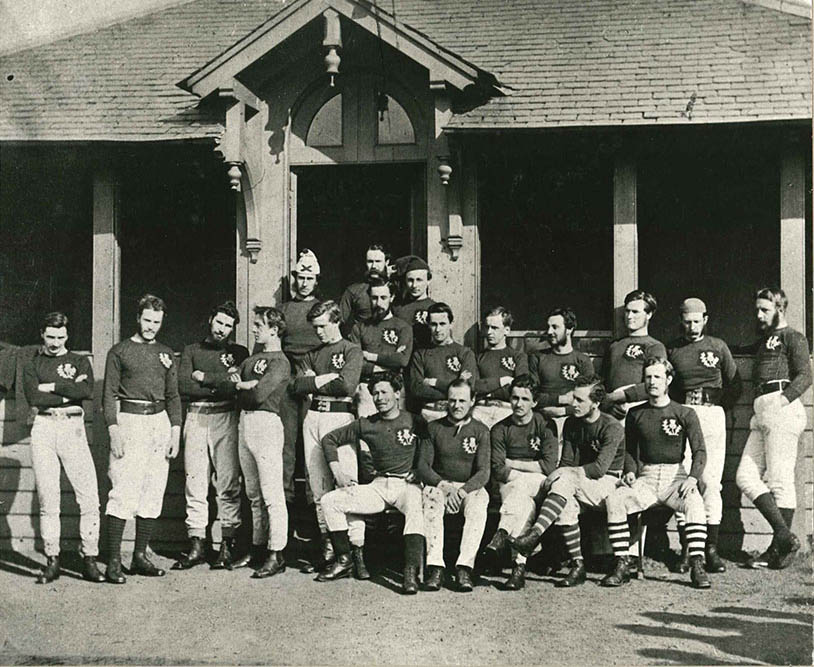
Scotland's First Rugby Team, 1871, for the 1st international, v England in Edinburgh, Scotland won by 1 goal & 1 try to 1 try

The world's oldest continual rugby fixture was first played in 1858 between Merchiston Castle School and the former pupils of The Edinburgh Academy.

Scotland was responsible for organising the very first rugby International when a side representing England met the Scottish national side on the cricket field of the Edinburgh Academy at their Raeburn Place ground on 27 March 1871; Scotland won by one goal. The Scottish Football Union (SFU) - later named SRU - was founded in 1873 (in the Staff Common Room at The Glasgow Academy) and was a founding member of the International Rugby Board in 1886 with Ireland and Wales. (England refused to join until 1890).

Since that time, Scotland have been regular winners of the Calcutta Cup, the five nations championship (discontinued), and have been participants of (having never actually won) the Six Nations Championship, and every Rugby World Cup.

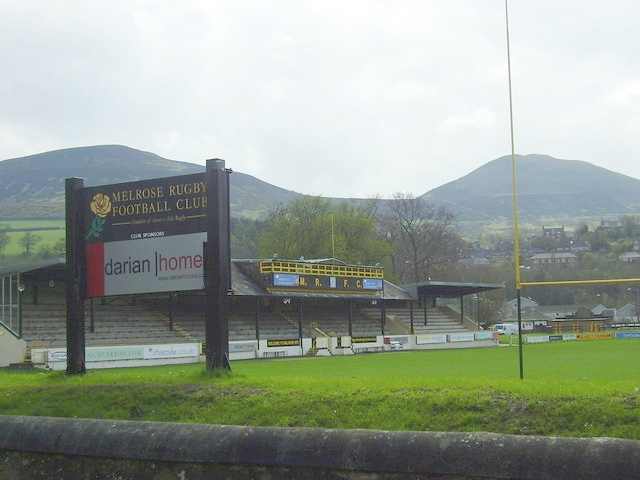
Nestling beneath the shadow of the Eildon Hills, the Greenyards at Melrose in Scotland (here c. 2008) is the original home of rugby sevens

Scotland has played a seminal role in the development of rugby, notably in rugby sevens, which were initially conceived by Ned Haig, a butcher from Melrose as a fundraising event for his local club in 1883. The first ever officially sanctioned international tournament of rugby occurred at Murrayfield as part of the "Scottish Rugby Union's celebration of rugby" centenary celebrations in 1973. Due to the success of the format, the ongoing Hong Kong Sevens was launched three years later. In 1993, the Rugby World Cup Sevens was launched and the trophy is known as the Melrose Cup in memory of Ned Haig's invention.

In 1924 the SFU changed its name to the Scottish Rugby Union. International games were played at Inverleith from 1899 to 1925 when Murrayfield was opened.

== Competitions ==
See also Scottish rugby union system

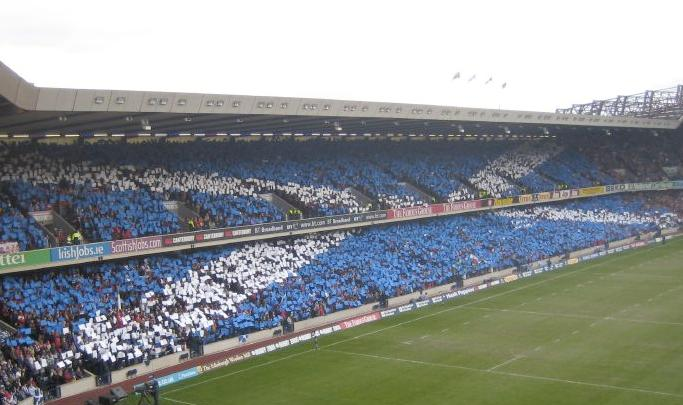
Murrayfield rugby stadium

Historically rugby union was an amateur sport, but the dawn of professionalism changed the way in which the game was structured. The game is divided into professional and non-professional spheres.

Previously there had been a domestic league that covered the country, the top division of which was essentially the elite of club rugby in Scotland. This league was established in the early 1970s to replace the complicated "unofficial championship" that had been competed for previously. Starting in the 1973–74 season, the clubs were organised into a league of six divisions – what today comprises the Scottish Premiership and National League elements of the League Championship. Originally, below the six divisions (but not connected by promotion or relegation) were a series of District Leagues, covering smaller geographical areas, organised by District Unions and sometimes involving second XVs. Over a period of time, these District divisions have been reformed and integrated into the Scottish rugby union system meaning that today, only four clubs do not have their first XVs in the interconnected league structure.

The entire system is sponsored by the Royal Bank of Scotland (or RBS), making it known as the RBS League Championship. This league contains Scottish rugby union's traditional big name clubs, such as Melrose and Hawick, as well as major city clubs such as Boroughmuir, Heriots and Watsonians from Edinburgh, and Glasgow Hawks who were formed from an amalgamation of clubs in the 1990s.

== Clubs ==
Traditionally, rugby clubs were often formed by universities, ex-pupils of independent schools and large state schools, and many clubs names still to this day include abbreviations such as:

- 'High School Former Pupils' (for instance, Dundee HSFP RFC)
- 'Former Pupils' (for instance, Stewart's Melville FP RFC)
- 'Grammar School Former Pupils' (for instance, Aberdeen GSFP RFC)
- 'University' (Aberdeen University Rugby Football Club AURFC)

However, with the introduction of the league system in the 1970s and the resulting increase in competitiveness and standard of play, most of these clubs have had to loosen their participation criteria to include non ex-pupils. In most cases though the clubs squads do still comprise a large proportion of individuals with connections to the schools. Often the clubs will be part-financed, and their grounds maintained or even owned, by the schools themselves. In recent years the success of traditional 'Borders' league clubs such as Gala, Hawick etc were superimposed by the new breed of clubs such as Ayr RFC, Glasgow Hawks and Stirling County with Ayr securing three Premiership and Cup wins since 2008.

Amalgamations of clubs are also reasonably frequent, and when this occurs the clubs often combine names, as in Hillhead Jordanhill RFC or Waysiders/Drumpellier RFC.

== Other leagues ==
Scotland is also home to the oldest organised rugby union league in the world, the Border League, which was formed in 1901. The Border League does not take part in the pyramid structure of the National League, but all its clubs participate in it (and thus the Border League is now effectively a supplementary competition). Two small 'independent' leagues remain outside the system, the Highland Alliance League and the Grampian Alliance League but they have only four clubs between them (the remaining membership being second XVs of clubs in the League Championship) and are not likely to remain in existence for much longer.

Aside from the schools, the other 'traditional powerhouse' of rugby in Scotland was the universities, and to this day the Scottish universities have their own league system independent of the BUCS system which covers the rest of Great Britain. However, the BUCS Scottish Conference comprises divisions of four or five teams, and therefore not many fixtures each season, so unofficial Saturday University Leagues are organised (somewhat informally) between the universities. As well as having their own leagues the universities often compete in the SRU league structure and cup competitions to a high standard, most notably in 2007–08 Aberdeen University became the first university side to make the SHE SRU finals day winning the Plate competition. The significance of the universities to the history of the SRU is evident when it is noted that four of the oldest 17 SRU affiliated clubs are university teams.

Due to the social and amateur nature of the game, most clubs try to run as many teams as possible so that players get games on most weekends, and therefore a large system of what are effectively reserve leagues operate. Known as second XV, third XV, fourth XV, etc. depending on the quality of the players making up each team, their competitive activities were formally all supervised by The Scottish 2nd XV League - however in recent years disputes and breakaways have led to the formation of independent 2nd XV leagues in the Scottish Borders and in and around Edinburgh.

See University Leagues in Scotland and 2nd XV Leagues in Scotland for details. For schools rugby see Brewin Dolphin Scottish Schools Cup.

== Changes for the professional era ==
When professionalism was introduced into rugby union in the 1990s, and the Heineken Cup created for clubs across Europe, the SRU decided that the existing clubs operating in the Scottish leagues were not competitive enough. They were predominantly amateur, or at best paid small wages; they had low supports and small old-fashioned venues; and the quality of their play was, by the nature of these factors, comparatively low versus new professional clubs, provinces and regions in other countries. As a rule their players trained only two nights a week.

Scotland has the oldest District provincial rugby sides in the world. The Glasgow - Edinburgh district derby was first played in 1872, hence the 1872 Cup played today. The District sides traditionally drew together the best amateur players from clubs in a given area; and the Scottish Inter-District Championship was founded in 1953. There were four standard districts – Glasgow District; Edinburgh District; North and Midlands; and South – they occasionally competed with an Anglo-Scots or Exile side as a fifth district in the Championship.

The SRU decided to turn these standard Districts into four professional teams based roughly on the old districts: the Border Reivers based in Galashiels (with occasional matches elsewhere), the Caledonia Reds based in Aberdeen and Perth, Edinburgh and Glasgow.

The aim of creating these 'pro-teams' or 'super-teams' was ensure that Scotland had fairly competitive sides operating in the European competitions, the Heineken Cup and European Challenge Cup (as well as the European Shield during its short existence), and to drive up standards of rugby in the country including developing players for the national side.

Initially the 'pro-teams' were still competing in the Scottish Inter-District Championship, but a Welsh-Scottish League later developed, and from that development came the Celtic League with Ireland's introduction (and for a time there was also a cup competition, the Celtic Cup). The Celtic League has further expanded and is now known as the Pro14 and consists of Scottish, Welsh, Irish, Italian and South African sides.

=== From four teams to two ===
The four professional teams struggled in European competition and were a heavy financial burden for the union and for the formation of the Celtic League they were amalgamated into Edinburgh Reivers and Glasgow Caledonian Reds playing in Edinburgh and Glasgow respectively, and later renamed simply Edinburgh and Glasgow.

After a few seasons with two teams, the SRU then reformed a Borders team, initially known as Border Reivers, then renamed The Borders, before reverting to Border Reivers again. At the time of this last change the other two sides were renamed Edinburgh Gunners and Glasgow Warriors. However, the SRU's extreme financial difficulties (they were over £20M in debt) forced yet another re-think (especially when the Border Reivers were rooted to the bottom of the Celtic League season after season) – at the end of season 2005–06, Edinburgh Gunners were sold to a private consortium led by Alex Carruthers, and renamed Edinburgh Rugby.

=== Continuing difficulties ===
However, even with the running costs of two instead of three teams, the SRU were still struggling. Attempts were made to find private backers for Glasgow or the Borders (although the only investors interested in the latter wanted to move it to Falkirk, Stirling or Aberdeen) but in the end neither of the teams could be sold. As a result, at the end of 2006–07 the SRU yet again disbanded the Border Reivers, leaving Scotland with two pro-teams, one under private and one under SRU control.

The relationship with Alex Carruthers and his ERC Group which owned Edinburgh Rugby proved to be very uncomfortable. The SRU defaulted on payments of competition prize money to ERC, requiring the consortium to invest their own additional funds, and the SRU refused to share bar takings from Edinburgh Rugby matches at Murrayfield with ERC – at the same time, the SRU was unhappy about the signing policy and the unavailability of players for international team training.

Following a bitter dispute in the press and media during 2007, in which legal action was started, and for a time Edinburgh Rugby was banned from participating in matches, the SRU agreed to buy back Edinburgh Rugby from Alex Carruthers. This caused much unrest in the Scottish Borders, as their team had been wound up only months before, when the SRU insisted it could not finance two pro-teams on its own.

The SRU announced shortly after its buy-back that it intended to rename Edinburgh Rugby as Edinburgh RFC in the future.

From 2014–15. the Heineken Cup and original European Challenge Cup were respectively replaced by the European Rugby Champions Cup and European Rugby Challenge Cup. Scotland was guaranteed one place in the Champions Cup, awarded to the Scottish team that finished higher in the previous Pro12 season. The other Scottish team could qualify for the Champions Cup if it was one of the three Pro12 clubs with the best record, outside of the top team from each Pro12 nation (Ireland, Italy, Scotland, Wales). Additionally, starting in 2015–16, the second Scottish team could potentially qualify through a play-off involving another Pro12 side and one each from the English Premiership and France's Top 14. Otherwise, that team will participate in the Challenge Cup.

With Pro12 adding two South African teams in 2017–18, leading to that competition adopting its current name of Pro14, the qualification system for the Champions Cup was changed. Effective with the 2017–18 Pro14 season, the top three teams from each of Pro14's two conferences, excluding the South African sides, automatically qualify for the following season's Champions Cup. The previous requirement that each Celtic nation and Italy be represented in the Champions Cup was eliminated. A seventh place in the Champions Cup is awarded to the winner of a play-off between the next best-placed eligible team (again excluding South African sides) from each conference. As in the past, Scottish sides that do not qualify for the Champions Cup receive a place in the Challenge Cup.

Most recently, the SRU has invested in Major League Rugby, a fledgling professional league based in the United States. MLR launched in 2018 with seven teams in the United States, and expanded to nine in 2019 with the addition of single teams in the U.S. and Canada. The SRU purchased a minority stake in Washington, D.C.–based Old Glory DC, one of three U.S. teams set to join MLR in 2020.

== Popularity ==
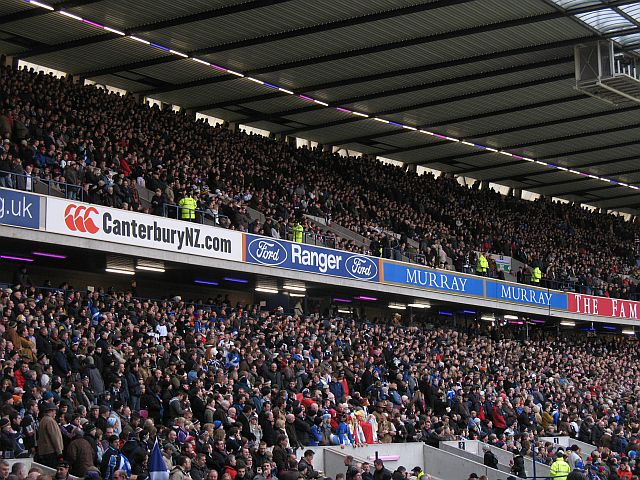
The West Stand of Murrayfield Stadium, demonstrating the popularity of Scottish rugby at international level

Rugby union is one of the national sports of Scotland. It is most popular in the Borders region where it is played widely, although even here ground is being lost to football, with professionalism and migration contributing to the challenges facing the game . In the rest of the country rugby tends to be played mainly by private schools.

Whilst attendances at club matches in Scotland are fairly poor, the national team draws a sizeable crowd to Murrayfield for Six Nations matches. Some traditionalists claim that in recent years the national rugby union team has become a focal point for football-type sporting nationalism.

Aside from Murrayfield, there are few major rugby stadiums in Scotland. Many clubs in the Scottish Borders have grandstands and city sides in Edinburgh and Glasgow also have seated, covered stands.

=== Statistics ===
According to the International Rugby Board as of September 2010, Scotland has 241 rugby union clubs; 343 referees; 7,556 pre-teen male players; 13,402 teen male players; 10,556 senior male players (total male players 31,514) as well as 1,303 (total) female players. However, many pre teen players are not registered with the SRU.

=== Demographics ===
Rugby union is particularly popular in the Borders region. The towns of Hawick, Galashiels, Jedburgh and Selkirk have produced many international players.

== National team ==
The first international rugby union match in the world was played between England and Scotland in Edinburgh in 1871. Scotland won 4–1. The national side is considered by the IRB to belong in the top tier of nations, although they are not as competitive as the elite sides such as New Zealand or South Africa. They usually play their home matches at Murrayfield Stadium in the West End of Edinburgh.

Scotland contest the Calcutta Cup with England as part of the Six Nations Championship. The Calcutta Cup was last won by Scotland in the 2021 Six Nations Championship beating England 11–6.

Every four years the British and Irish Lions go on tour with players from Scotland as well as England, Ireland and Wales. Scottish players are also regularly selected to represent The Barbarians.

== Scottish Sports Hall of Fame ==
The following rugby players have been inducted to the Scottish Sports Hall of Fame:

- Finlay Calder
- Douglas Elliot
- Gavin Hastings
- Andy Irvine
- George MacPherson
- Mark Morrison
- David Sole
- Robert Wilson Shaw
- Grahame Budge

At least two other rugby players were inducted primarily for achievements in other sports – Eric Liddell in athletics, and Leslie Balfour-Melville (1854–1937), who played many other sports, as an all-rounder.

== See also ==
- Sport in Scotland
- Sport in the United Kingdom
- Rugby union in the British Isles
- Rugby league in Scotland

== Bibliography ==
- Bath, Richard (ed.) The Complete Book of Rugby (Seven Oaks Ltd, 1997 ISBN 1-86200-013-1)
- Richards, Huw A Game for Hooligans: The History of Rugby Union (Mainstream Publishing, Edinburgh, 2007, ISBN 978-1-84596-255-5)
