= Adam Kelso Fulton =

Scottish rugby union player (1929–1994)

- Born: 10 April 1929 18 Walker Street, Edinburgh, Scotland
- Died: 27 August 1994 (aged 65) Kinross, Scotland
- School: Dollar Academy
- University: Edinburgh University
- Notable relative: Adam Fulton (father)

Rugby union career
- Position: Scrum-half
Senior career
Years	Team	Apps	(Points)
1947-52	Edinburgh University		
1948	Colonel Usher's XV		
1949	Co-Optimists		
1950-51	Leamington RFC		
1952	Scottish Universities XV		
1952-1953	Fife District XV		
1952-53	Dollar Academicals		
1953	Midlands District XV		
1954-55	The Army - Depot and TE RAMC		
1954	Public Schools' Wanderers Club		
1955	Hampshire County		
1955	J. MacG. K. Kendall-Carpenter's XV		
1957	Perth and Angus District XV		
1957-58	Panmure RFC		
195?	Perthshire Academicals		
International career
Years	Team	Apps	(Points)
1952-1954	Scotland	2	(0)

Adam Kelso Fulton (10 April 1929 – 27 August 1994) was a Scottish rugby union internationalist.

== International career ==
Positioned as scrum-half, he was capped twice playing both games against France at Murrayfield in 1952 and 1954.

The initial selection match reunited the successful university pairing of Fulton and JNG Davidson, and was where both had the “distinction of gaining “caps” on the strength of one trial”. This was also the first international club partnership to be established since H Waddell and JB Nelson of Glasgow Academicals some 25 years prior. The pair also teamed up again for Fulton's second cap.

Norman Mair wrote of him, “he was a tough and ubiquitous little battler who was naturally very competitive and who had any amount of courage”.

== Senior career ==
His association with the sport started at school, Dollar Academy, where he was also a Scottish Schools' internationalist, and continued with a number of teams including Edinburgh University, Leamington RFC, Dollar Academicals, The Army, Perthshire Academicals, and Panmure RFC. Upon invitation, he played for Colonel Usher's XV, the Co-Optimists, the Public Schools' Wanderers, and J. MacG. K. Kendall-Carpenter's XV. Combined, county, and district level representation included, the Scottish Universities XV, Hampshire, Fife, Perth and Angus, and the Midlands District who he captained against the North of Scotland on 10 October 1953. Injury and the demands of his profession shortened his playing career.

In 1983, he became president of the Dollar Academicals, and since 1995, the Kelso Fulton Cup is awarded to the winner of an annual fixture held between the Accies and Edinburgh Borders RFC.

== Personal life ==
Kelso Fulton was born at 18 Walker Street, Edinburgh, Scotland on 10 April 1929. In 1952, he graduated Bachelor of Medicine and Bachelor of Surgery (MBChB) from the University of Edinburgh. In 1956, he was recalled to the Royal Army Medical Corps for Operation Musketeer (Suez) and served with the 4th Field Dressing Station, which was established at the Ophthalmic Hospital, Port Said, Egypt. Following a period of voluntary work with the Grenfell Mission in Labrador, working in the outlying areas and with the hospital ship, he entered into general practice. Appointments included, Aberfeldy, then Audley – where, on 21 July 1963, he was selected county Divisional Surgeon to the St John Ambulance Brigade – and finally, from 1967 onwards, Kinross.

Fulton, together with his wife Norma (née Reid) were active members of the community. In 1976, he was the founding President of the Kinross and District Rotary Club – a permanent memorial fund was established in his name to support children's education in Mombasa, Kenya; he served on the Kinross Primary School Board; his advocacy and efforts resulted in the establishment of the Hayfield Wildlife Garden; he received a Chief Scout commendation for his work with the organisation. He was also a past president of both the curling and tennis clubs; he helped to organise the Kinross half marathons; and he was a keen supporter of Kinross Rugby Club.

Fulton was an individual “who maintained the highest ideals of fellowship and service”, and one who also held a “desire to encourage achievement at all levels”.
