= Highland League =

Highland League may refer to:

- Highland Football League, which operates in the north of Scotland
- Highland Land League which fought for tenants rights
- Highland Alliance League, a small rugby union competition in the north of Scotland
