= HSFP =

HSFP may refer to:

- Human Frontier Science Program, a non-profit organization that funds basic research in life sciences
- Carnoustie HSFP (Carnoustie High School Former Pupils Rugby Football Club), a rugby union club based in Carnoustie, Scotland
- Dundee HSFP (Dundee High School Former Pupils Rugby Football Club), a former rugby union club in Dundee, Scotland
- Glasgow HSFP (Glasgow High School Former Pupils Rugby Football Club), a former rugby union club in Glasgow, Scotland
- Royal HSFP (Royal High School Former Pupils), a former rugby union club based in Edinburgh, Scotland
