= Dundee University Medics RFC =

Scottish rugby union club, based in Dundee

Dundee University Medics
- Full name: Dundee University Medics Rugby Football Club
- Founded: 2001
- Location: Dundee, Scotland
- Ground(s): Alloway Place, Morgan
- President: Toby Hughes
- Captain(s): Kieren Cutler, Jordan McKee (VC)
- League: Caledonia Midlands Three
- 2024–25: Caledonia Midlands Two, 4th of 9
Team kit

Dundee University Medics RFC is a rugby union club based in Dundee, Scotland. The Men's team currently plays in Caledonia Midlands Three. They most recently won Caledonia Midlands Two in the 2021-22 Season.

== History ==
The club was founded in 2001 and was in student developmental leagues before it joined the regional league structure of the Scottish Rugby Union in 2013.

It is not affiliated to Dundee University but does share resources and some players with Dundee University RFC.

In 2019, around 70% of its side were medical students but this percentage has fallen year on year, although the majority still are.

Dundee University Medics have been finalists in 4 successive seasons in the SRU Midlands Bowl.

They reached the final in 2016–17, losing to Blairgowrie RFC.

They reached the final again in 2017–18, losing out to Panmure RFC. The final that year was coined the ‘Snow Bowl’, as the 'Beast from the East' covered the pitch in deep snow, requiring both teams joining to clear the field, allowing the game to be played.

They beat Panmure 39-19 the following year. As a result, they progressed to the National Bowl. They then beat Glasgow University Medics in the semi-final of the National Bowl by 17–19, but narrowly lost out 36–31 to Aberdeenshire RFC in the 2018–19 National Bowl final at BT Murrayfield.

The team reached the Midlands Bowl Final of 2019-20 but were beaten by Kinross RFC.

Due to Winning Caledonia Midland 2 in 2021–22, the team will compete in the National Shield competition for the 2022–23 season.

== Honours ==
- Caledonia Midlands 3
  - Champions (1): 2017-18
- Caledonia Midlands 2
  - Champions (1): 2021-22
- Midlands Regional Bowl
  - Champions (1): 2018-19
  - Runners up (3) :2016-17, 2017–18, 2019–20
- National Bowl
  - Runners Up: 2018-19
