= Stornoway (disambiguation) =

Stornoway (Gaelic: Steòrnabhagh) is the major town and administrative centre of Na h-Eileanan Siar (the Western Isles) in Scotland.

Stornoway may also refer to:

== Places ==
- Stornoway (residence), the official residence of the Leader of His Majesty's Loyal Opposition in Canada
- Stornoway, Quebec, a village in the Estrie region of the Canadian province of Quebec
- Stornoway, Saskatchewan, a hamlet in the Canadian province of Saskatchewan

== Other uses ==
- Stornoway (band), a band from Oxford, United Kingdom
- Stornoway (clipper), an 1850 British tea clipper
- Stornoway Airport, near Stornoway, Scotland
- Stornoway Communications, a television broadcasting and production company
- RAF Stornoway, near Stornoway, Scotland
- Stornoway RFC, a rugby union club based in Stornoway, Scotland
