= Caledonia Regional League =

Rugby union league competition

Caledonia Regional Leagues
- Sport: Rugby union
- Founded: 1973
- No. of teams: 59 (seven divisions)
- Country: Scotland
- Most recent champions: Div 1: Orkney; Div 2 Midlands: Dundee University Medics; Div 2 North: Highland 2XV; Div 3 Midlands: Dundee Morgan; Div 3 North: North Police Scotland
- Level on pyramid: 5–8
- Promotion to: Scottish National League Division Three
- Domestic cups: BT Shield and BT Regional Bowl

The Caledonia Regional League (currently named the Tennent's Caledonia League for sponsorship reasons) is one of three Regional Leagues operated by the Scottish Rugby Union (SRU), which play at a level below that of the National League structure.

Historically, these divisions were district leagues under the jurisdiction of the North of Scotland Rugby Union and the Midlands District Rugby Union, but have now come under the auspices of the SRU.

Winners of the top division progress to Scottish National League Division Three. Below Division One, the league is regionalised further into Midlands and North divisions.

== Caledonia Regional League, 2021–22 ==
2nd and 3rd XVs not included.

=== Caledonia 1 ===
- Aberdeen Wanderers RFC
- Blairgowrie RFC
- Caithness
- Dunfermline RFC
- Ellon RFC
- Garioch RFC
- Glenrothes RFC
- Grangemouth Stags
- Hillfoots RFC
- Orkney RFC

=== Caledonia Midlands 2 ===
- Alloa RFC
- Carnoustie HSFP
- Dundee University Medics RFC
- Harris Academicals RFC
- Kinross RFC
- Madras Rugby
- Panmure

=== Caledonia North 2 ===
- Aberdeenshire RFC
- Banff RFC
- Mackie Academy RFC
- Moray RFC
- North Police Scotland RFC
- Ross Sutherland RFC

=== Caledonia Midlands 3 ===
- Bannockburn RFC
- Bo'ness RFC
- Crieff and Strathearn RFC
- Grangemouth Stags 2XV
- Perthshire 2XV
- Rosyth Sharks
- Strathmore 2XV
- Waid Academy F.P.

=== Caledonia North 3 ===
- Aberdeen University RFC
- Huntly RFC
- Kinloss RFC
- RAF Lossiemouth RFC
- Shetland RFC
- Stornoway RFC

=== Caledonia Midlands 4 ===
- Aberfeldy RFC
- Arbroath RFC
- Bo'ness RFC
- Stobswell RFC

=== Caledonia North 4 ===
- Aberdeen Taexali
- Aberdeen University Medics RFC
- Deeside RFC
- Dyce RFC
- Fraserburgh RFC
- Inverness Craig Dunain RFC
- Peterhead RFC
- Turriff RFC

=== Caledonia Midlands Non-League ===
- Atholl RFC
- Abertay University RFC

=== Caledonia North Non-League ===
- 3Scots RFC
- Alford Youth

== See also ==
- East Regional League
- West Regional League
