= Jason White (rugby union) =

British Lions & Scotland international rugby union player

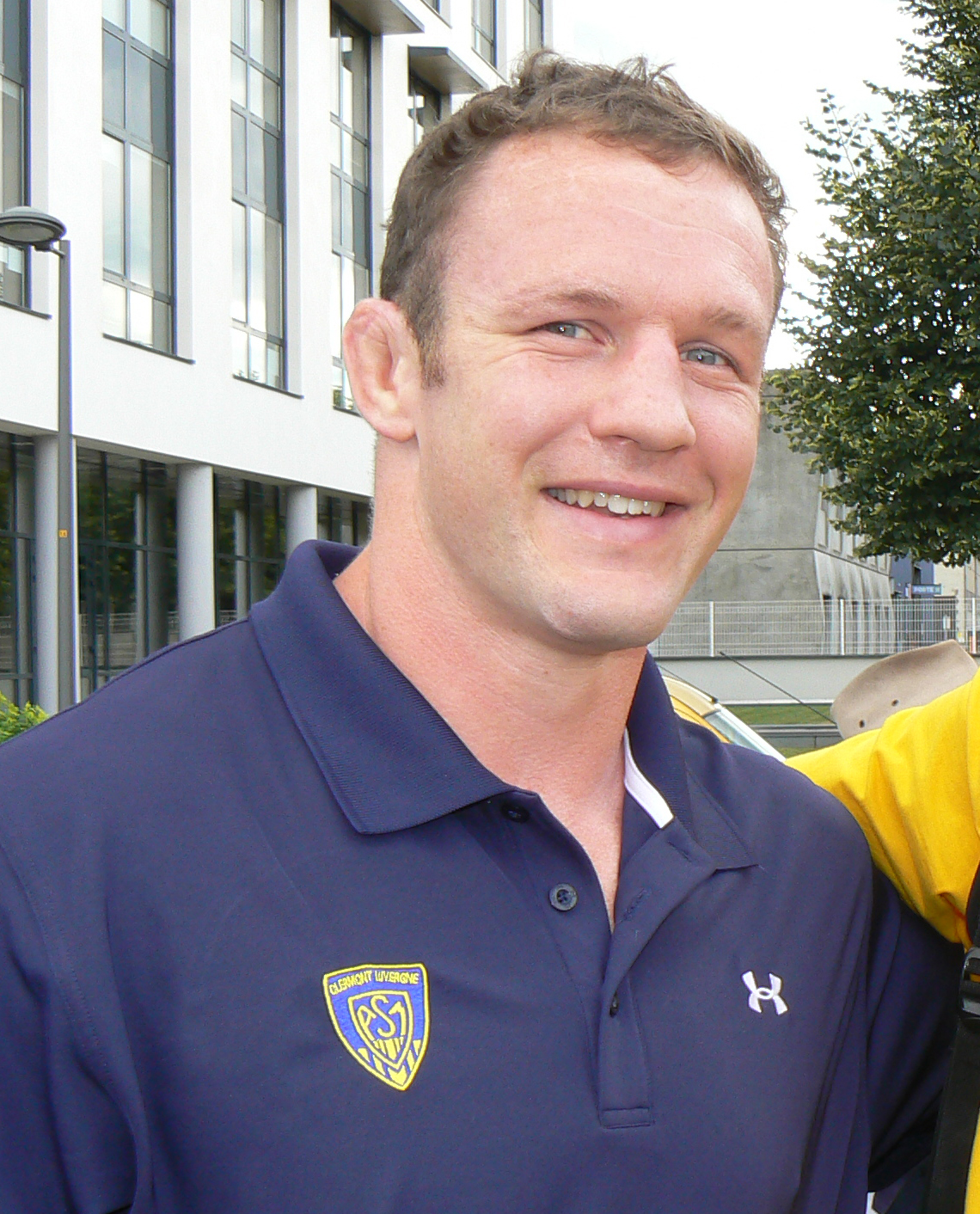
- Born: Jason Phillip Randall White; 17 April 1978 (age 48) Edinburgh, Scotland
- Height: 6 ft 5 in (1.96 m)
- Weight: 17 st 0 lb (108 kg)
- School: Culter Primary, Cults Academy, George Watson's College

Rugby union career
- Position(s): Lock, flanker, number eight
Amateur team(s)
Years	Team	Apps	(Points)
- Aberdeen Wanderers RFC
1998–2000	Watsonians		
Senior career
Years	Team	Apps	(Points)
1996–1998	Caledonia Reds		
1998–2003	Glasgow Caledonians	90	(40)
2003–2009	Sale Sharks	105	(25)
2009–2012	Clermont	33	(5)
International career
Years	Team	Apps	(Points)
2000–2009	Scotland	77	(20)
2005	British & Irish Lions		
- Correct as of 4 January 2011

Jason Phillip Randall White (born 17 April 1978) is a Scottish former rugby union footballer. He was a utility forward who played in the second or back row of the scrum – lock, flanker, or number eight. White played at club level for Glasgow Caledonians (now known as Glasgow Warriors); the French Top 14 side ASM Clermont Auvergne; and English Premiership side Sale Sharks. He won 77 caps playing for Scotland, captaining the side on 19 occasions.

== Early life ==
White grew up in The Paddock, Peterculter, Aberdeen and was educated at Cults Academy and then at George Watson's College in Edinburgh, leaving in 1996. He first started playing rugby union when a friend invited him to join a local team in Aberdeen – Aberdeen Wanderers. He quickly rose through the ranks of the Scotland Under-18 and Under-21 Squads.

== Captain of Scotland ==
White was named the new captain of the Scotland national team by Scotland coach Frank Hadden after an injury to Jon Petrie. White led them for the first time in the test against Argentina at Murrayfield on 12 November 2005. He also led them in the famous win against France on 4 February 2006 at Murrayfield when he earned his 50th Scottish cap. Shortly after he led Scotland to another famous victory, 18–12 over the 'Auld Enemy' at Murrayfield, therefore recovering the Calcutta Cup. He received the Man of the Match award for his outstanding contribution to the victory. In the final fixture, White hit (in a legal tackle) Andrea Lo Cicero so hard that it forced a penalty for holding on. This penalty was kicked by Chris Paterson to secure a 13–10 victory for Scotland. The tackle was similar to the one on Joe Worsley in the Calcutta Cup match which snuffed out the final England attack.

== Awards ==
On 21 April 2006, White was named The Famous Grouse Scotland Player of the Season 2005–06. In the tenth year of the awards it was the first time that a serving Scotland captain has been declared winner.

On 10 May 2006 White received the Guinness Premiership Player's Player of the Year Award after receiving the same accolade in his native Scotland. In the 2005–06 season, White started the final as Sale Sharks won their first ever Premiership title.

White was named in a "World XV of the year" chosen in The New Zealand Herald newspaper in 2006.

In recognition of both his skills and sportsmanship his founding influence Aberdeen Wanderers RFC renamed their pavilion in his honour in April 2006.

In January 2007, White was awarded the Pat Marshall Memorial Award for season 2005–06 by the Rugby Union Writers' Club.

== Injury and recovery ==
White was out of action from November 2006 until August 2007 after having sustained an injury to his anterior cruciate ligament in the 2006 Autumn test match against Romania; he underwent reconstructive surgery shortly after the injury. He returned to the Scotland squad in their 2007 Rugby World Cup warm-up against Ireland at Murrayfield on 11 August, captaining the side to a 31–21 win. He was again the captain of Scotland at the World Cup finals. White joined Clermont Auvergne in 2009 after signing from Sale Sharks. He was released by them in 2012.

== Personal life ==
In 2017 White took his first steps into teaching with a role at Loretto School.
