= Aberdeen University Medics RFC =

Scottish rugby union club, based in Aberdeen

- Full name: Aberdeen University Medics Rugby Football Club
- Location: Aberdeen, Scotland
- Ground(s): Kings Playing Fields, Aberdeen
- League: Caledonia North Division Three
- 2025–26: Caledonia North Two Grampian, 5th of 7
Team kit

Official website
- www.pitchero.com/clubs/aberdeenunimedics

Aberdeen University Medics RFC is a rugby union club based in Aberdeen, Scotland. The Men's team currently plays in Caledonia North Division Three.

== History ==
As well as playing in the Scottish Rugby Union leagues, the team also play in the Scottish and Northern Irish Medical Schools competition.

The club was one point clear with a game in hand at the top of the Caledonia North 4 league at the time in March 2020 when the Scottish Rugby Union pulled the plug on the league due to the COVID-19 pandemic and declared the season null and void. The SRU had put 5 models to the clubs and over half went for the null and void option.

The 2020 President of the club Jeremie Juan stated:

It was obviously hard to take after playing so well. We thought we were home and dry. There will be no league trophy after all our hard work, though there will be lots of good memories. But the important thing at this moment in time is to look after each other. Rugby is secondary to what is going on in the world. The experience will have served us well for next season. Especially as many of the guys will be with us again for another campaign.

The Medics scored 318 points in the league campaign that season, with an average of 35 points per game.

The club did a 24-hour walking challenge for charity in May 2021. This was part of the 'Every Mile for Our NHS' challenge, which aimed to support 3 charities:- The Royal Medical Benevolent Fund; The Cavell Nurses' Trust; and Doctors in Distress.

The President of the club in 2021 David Raftery explained:

While we'd obviously be delighted if people could donate in support of our efforts – cardio is quite alien to rugby players – we also want our run to raise awareness of these three good causes and encourage others to do their own fundraising. We're so grateful that the staff at NHS Grampian and Highland have been teaching us throughout this very difficult year, and this is a small thing we can do to repay them.

== Sides ==
The club states that you don't need to be a medic to play for the side.
