= Scottish rugby union system =

Club rugby union in Scotland

Domestic club rugby union within Scotland remains a predominantly amateur sport; however, semi-professional and professional outfits have been created in recent decades to participate in cross-border competitions.

== Professional Outfits ==
With the advent of professionalism in 1995 the Scottish Rugby Union, just like the Irish Rugby Football Union, decided that existing club sides would be unable to compete with their counterparts in new cross-border tournaments such as the European Cup and Celtic League. It was decided by the Scottish Rugby Union that new professional teams would be created based on the union's four historic geographical districts and building upon the legacy/vehicle of the Scottish Inter-District Championship:

Team	Representing District	Home Base	Professionally Active
Border Reivers	South	Galashiels	1996–1998 and 2002–2007
Caledonia Reds	North and Midlands	Aberdeen and Perth	1996–1998
Edinburgh	Edinburgh District	Edinburgh	1996–Present
Glasgow Warriors	Glasgow District	Glasgow	1996–Present

The North and Midlands side was a de facto district based on the combination of The North and Midlands districts.

== Men's system ==
=== Scottish League Championship ===
The Scottish League Championship is the annual domestic league structure competed for by over 150 amateur clubs at both national and regional levels. All competitions are currently sponsored by Arnold Clark.

Prior to restructuring in 2011, there were six national leagues - three divisions in the Premiership, and three in the National League - above the Regional Leagues. Further restructuring before the 2014–15 season scrapped the regional Championship A & B leagues which sat below the National League for two seasons. Following the end of the semi-pro Super Series in 2024 an additional fifth national division was added. The current structure is:

- Premiership: 10 clubs, top four compete in a knock-out play-off to decide the Scottish champions.
- National League: 40 clubs in four divisions (One, Two, Three, and Four).
- Regional Leagues: three Regions (Caledonia, East and West) who organise their own league structures (though top divisions normally consist of 8–10 clubs), with the winners of each region promoted to the national setup.

==== Structure ====
Tier	Total Clubs (157)	League(s) / Division(s)			
	50	National Competitions			
1	10	Scottish Premiership; 10 clubs playing 18 games (with top 4 playoff) ↓ 1 relegation spot + 1 relegation playoff spot			
2	10	Scottish National League Division 1; 10 clubs playing 18 games ↑ 1 promotion spot + 1 promotion playoff spot ↓ 1 relegation spot			
3	10	Scottish National League Division 2; 10 clubs playing 18 games ↑ 1 promotion spot ↓ 1 relegation spot			
4	10	Scottish National League Division 3; 10 clubs playing 18 games ↑ 1 promotion spot ↓ 1 relegation spot			
5	10	Scottish National League Division 4; 10 clubs playing 18 games ↑ 1 promotion spot ↓ 3 relegation spots			
	107	Regional Leagues			
6	34	Caledonia Region League Division 1 Midlands and North Conferences; 16 clubs (two conferences) playing 14 games ↑ 1 promotion playoff spot each ↓ 1 relegation spot each		East Region League Division 1; 8 clubs playing 14 games ↑ 1 promotion spot ↓ 2 relegation spots	West Region League Division 1; 10 clubs playing 18 games ↑ 1 promotion spot ↓ 2 relegation spots
7	33	Caledonia Region League Division 2 Midlands; 8 clubs playing 14 games ↑ 1 promotion spot ↓ 1 relegation spot	Caledonia Region League Division 2 North; 8 clubs playing 14 games ↑ 1 promotion spot ↓ 1 relegation spot	East Region League Division 2; 8 clubs playing 14 games ↑ 2 promotion spots ↓ 2 relegation spots	West Region League Division 2; 9 clubs playing 16 games ↑ 1 promotion spot ↓ 2 relegation spots
8	40	Caledonia Region League Division 3 Midlands; 8 clubs playing 14 games ↑ 1 promotion spot	Caledonia Region League Division 3 North; 14 clubs playing TBC games ↑ TBC promotion spots	East Region League Division 3; 8 clubs playing 14 games ↑ 2 promotion spots	West Region League Division 3; 10 clubs playing 18 games ↑ 2 promotion spots

=== Cup Competitions ===
==== Scottish Cup ====
The Scottish Cup was introduced in 1995 as a complementary knock-out cup competition. Though the structure of the cup has been changed numerous times it is currently contested by 20 clubs from the Premiership and National League Division 1. The main cup competition is supplemented by the National League Cup for the remaining 30 clubs in the National League alongside regional Shield and Bowl competitions which all culminate in an end of season 'Finals Day' at Murrayfield Stadium.

==== Scottish SuperCup ====
During the 2006–07 season an extra cup competition (The Scottish SuperCup) was introduced to replace the loss of fixtures in the Premiership due to league restricting. With the reversal of this restriction the following season the cup became redundant and was abandoned after a single season.

==== British and Irish Cup ====
For the 2009–10 season a new cross-border tournament was introduced, the British and Irish Cup which contained semi-professional clubs from the four home nations. Originally Scotland was represented by three sides but this increased to the top four in the Premiership. The Scottish sides withdrew after the 2013–14 edition and the competition was abolished in 2018.

=== Reserve Leagues ===
Separately, a league system exists at national and regional level featuring club's second or lower XVs. The Inter-City Reserve League consists of teams from both the east and west in its two divisions, while below this the East and West regions also have two divisions each. As of 2026–27 this totals 57 teams, with promotion and relegation between the divisions.

The Caledonia Regional League allows second or lower XVs to participate, but they are not eligible for promotion to National League Division 4. Second and lower XVs are not permitted to participate in the East or West Regional Leagues.

=== Unincorporated Leagues ===
Scotland is also home to the oldest organised rugby union league in the world, the Border League, which was formed in 1901. The Border League does not take part in the pyramid structure to the National League, but all of its clubs play in both. For university leagues, see University Leagues in Scotland.

== Women's System ==
Women's rugby union in Scotland was amalgamated with the main governing body, Scottish Rugby Union in 2009 after a unanimous vote at their AGM

The Women's domestic rugby union leagues in Scotland are organised in a similar vein to the men's domestic leagues: on a national basis for the top leagues and regional leagues below feeding into those leagues.

Restructuring in 2019 reduced the number of national divisions from three to two, while at the same time adding new regional leagues. The national second tier was removed in 2023 however it has been restored for the 2026–27 season.

=== League Structure ===
Tier	Total Clubs (56)	League(s) / Division(s)		
	14	National Competitions		
1	8	Premiership; 8 clubs playing 13 games ↓ 1 relegation spot		
2	6	National League; 6 clubs playing 10 games ↑ 1 promotion spot ↓ TBC relegation spots		
	42	Regional Leagues		
3	17	Caledonia Midlands/East Region League Division 1; 6 clubs playing TBC games ↑ TBC promotion spot ↓ 1 relegation spot	Caledonia North Region League Division 1; 5 clubs playing 8 games ↑ TBC promotion spot ↓ 1 relegation spot	West Region League Division 1; 6 clubs playing 10 games ↑ TBC promotion spot ↓ 1 relegation spot
4	19	Caledonia Midlands/East Region League Division 2; 8 clubs playing TBC games ↑ 1 promotion spot	Caledonia North Region League Division 2; 5 clubs playing 8 games ↑ 1 promotion spot	West Region League Division 2; 6 clubs playing 10 games ↑ 1 promotion spot ↓ 1 relegation spot
5	6			West Region League Division 3; 6 clubs playing 10 games ↑ 1 promotion spot

=== Cup Competitions ===
- Sarah Beaney Cup
- National Shield
- National Plate

== See also ==
- Rugby union in Scotland
- League system
