= Aberfeldy RFC =

Scottish rugby union club

- Full name: Aberfeldy Rugby Football Club
- Founded: 2015
- Location: Aberfeldy, Scotland
- Ground: Wade Park
- League: Caledonia Midlands Division Three
- 2025–26: Caledonia Midlands Division Two, 7th of 7 (relegated)
Team kit

Official website
- www.aberfeldyrfc.co.uk

Aberfeldy RFC is a rugby union club based in Aberfeldy, Scotland. The Men's team currently plays in Caledonia Midlands Division Three.

== History ==
Aberfeldy had an Aberfeldy Mini Rugby Club in the 1980s and early 1990s which received £150 of sponsorship money from the Vladivar Vodka Company; and an Aberfeldy and District over-30s team had an annual match with Pitlochry Aged Barbarians in the 1990s. The Aberfeldy and Pitlochry sides played for the Atholl Cup donated by Douglas Spaven of the Atholl Palace; and the charity funds for the match again went to the Aberfeldy Mini Rugby Club.

The present club Aberfeldy RFC was formed in 2015.

From 2015 to May 2021 they played their home matches at Kenmore thanks to the generosity of the Kenmore Sporting Association. However the club were keen to play in the town of Aberfeldy itself and in 2021 they secured a lease from the Atholl and Breadalbane Agricultural Society Ltd to play in Aberfeldy's Wade Park on the outskirts of the town. The move itself hit the headlines. The club used the muscle power of the men's and women's team to flit the 7 miles between Kenmore and Aberfeldy, which involved carrying the rugby posts on their shoulders that distance - led by a piper also walking the 7 miles. They raised over £1000 in charity; to be used for the Breadalbane Riding for the Disabled Association (BRDA) as well as the club's own youth section.

The club have appointed Aidan Kerr, former Cumnock RFC scrum half and with a BA (Hons) in Sports Studies from Stirling University, as a development officer. Kerr stated:

I’ve been really taken by how ambitious and enthusiastic Laurie and the rest of the committee are. There is a real sense of community spirit here. At the moment I'm working with eight schools, secondary and primary. Obviously with current covid restrictions we are limited with what we can do, but I'm confident things will grow quickly. For now, I'm focused on making connections with the young people, teachers and parents and we’ll go from there.

== Sides ==
The club have a men's and women's side.

The club run Saturday morning training events 'Rugby Tots' for children between 2 and 7; and at 1pm the youth section for Primary 3 & 4s upwards to Under 18s.

The club have advertised summer camps for children in July 2021.

They also run Sunday youth sessions for children.

On Tuesday nights they also organised touch rugby sessions for everyone.
