= Aberdeen Taexali =

Scottish rugby union club, based in Aberdeen

Aberdeen Taexali RFC
- Full name: Aberdeen Taexali Rugby Football Club
- Founded: 2018
- Location: Aberdeen, Scotland
- Ground: Woodside Sorts Complex
- League: Caledonia North Non-League
- 2024–25: Caledonia North Non-League
Team kit

Official website
- aberdeentaexali.com

Aberdeen Taexali is a rugby union club based in Aberdeen, Scotland. The men's team recently withdrew from Caledonia North Non-League, after failing to secure a regular playing squad.

== History ==
The club was founded in 2018 by Bryan Sinclair and Ross Barr-Hoyland. It is an inclusive club and welcomes anyone regardless of sexual orientation. The club ran its first taster session in November 2018 at Hazlehead Park Playing Fields. In 2019, the club formed a committee and a constitution.

== Sides ==
To become a member of the club, one must be aged 18 or over. People may attend four free training sessions before deciding to become a member.

The club trains on Wednesday nights from 6.30pm to 8pm at Woodside Sports Complex; and Sundays from 11am to 12.30pm.

== Honours ==
=== Men's ===
- Hadrians Cup
  - Champions (1): 2020
