= North Police Scotland RFC =

Scottish rugby union club, based in Aberdeen

- Full name: North Police Scotland Rugby Football Club
- Founded: 2013; 13 years ago
- Location: Aberdeen, Scotland
- Ground(s): Westdyke pitches, Westhill, Aberdeen
- League: Caledonia North Division Two
- 2025–26: Caledonia North Two Grampian, 1st of 7
Team kit

North Police Scotland RFC is a rugby union club based in Aberdeen, Scotland. The Men's team were deemed to play in Caledonia North Division Two for the 2021–22 season; however it was later announced that the team had withdrawn from the league for that season 'due to the inherent risk police officers carry every day & the potential risk of contracting COVID or being in close contact with someone who has COVID & resulting in a number of officers having to self-isolate'.

== History ==
Before the amalgamation of the different police forces in Scotland, each constabulary would have its own rugby union team, if it could generate enough support. In the 1850s there were 89 police constabularies in Scotland, but the number was constantly falling by merger. In 1939 the number stood at 48.

Thus we find Aberdeen City Police rugby team playing the Northeast Police rugby team and winning the charity cup in 1953.

In 1959 the number of police constabularies in Scotland stood at 33.

The small Scottish constabularies were merged in 1975 to become bigger units, so in the north: the Northern Constabulary covered the Highlands and Islands; and Grampian Police covered Aberdeen and the north-east of Scotland.

When those Scottish police forces were again restructured to become one single police force to cover the whole of Scotland in 2013, there was a similar restructuring in rugby union terms - although care was made to try and keep local identity if possible.

So, the police rugby union team that represented the previous north of Scotland constabularies of Grampian and Northern was then deemed North Police Scotland RFC.

== Sides ==
You do not have to be a police officer to play in the side; however you must have a connection with Police Scotland e.g. employed as a member of staff.
