= Tommy McGee =

Scottish rugby union player

- Born: Tommy McGee; 9 July 1979 (age 47) Thurso, Scotland
- Height: 1.86 m (6 ft 1 in)
- Weight: 260 lb (120 kg; 18 st 8 lb)
- School: Thurso High School

Rugby union career
- Position(s): Prop, prop
Senior career
Years	Team	Apps	(Points)
2005–2010	Leeds	27	(5)
Coaching career
- Years: Team
- 2010–14: Wharfedale R.U.F.C.
- 2014-15: Yorkshire Carnegie

Tommy McGee (born 9 July 1979 in Thurso, Scotland) is a Scottish former rugby union footballer for Leeds Tykes. His usual position is at prop. McGee was released by Leeds in 2010 and later that year was appointed head coach of Wharfedale. He has previously represented Scotland and Great Britain students at national rugby league.
