= Fraserburgh RFC =

Scottish rugby union club, based in Fraserburgh

- Full name: Fraserburgh Rugby Football Club
- Founded: 2014
- Location: Fraserburgh, Scotland
- Ground: James Ramsey Park
- League: Caledonia North Three
- 2024–25: Caledonia North Four, 5th of 6
Team kit

Fraserburgh RFC is a rugby union club based in Fraserburgh, Scotland. The Men's team currently plays in Caledonia North Three.

== History ==
There was a previous rugby club in the town dating from 1902. The Fraserburgh Herald and Northern Counties' Advertiser of Tuesday 21 October 1902 records the columnist delighted that the club has been formed:

I was pleased to hear that the Rugby Club which was hinted at in this column last week bad been so successfully formed and that my note was the means of awakening our friends round the corner. At Peterhead as well as Fraserburgh Rugby clubs have now been organised and before very long I hope we may have the pleasure of seeing the two meet. The matches should prove bit of a “take" for everyone.

This club played at the Links before moving to play at Bellslea Park.

The most famous player of this era was John T. R. McKay who played not only for the Fraserburgh rugby club, but the Fraserburgh cricket club too. He founded the original Turriff RFC in 1905. He was to later play for Aberdeenshire RFC and London Scottish F.C. There are no references to the club from the time of the First World War and it is assumed that the club did not survive this.

The present club was formed when Dean Underwood and Andy Homme Stott set about forming a rugby union club in the town in 1984. Underwood, who played at hooker, became the club president. He was to state:

The original idea was to provide playing opportunities for youngsters, the formation of a senior club came a little later, but we soon saw the potential of a league team after a number of players came forward. We briefly toyed with the idea of linking up with nearby Peterhead who were formed in 1984, but the very notion of having a liaison with a town who are traditionally deadly rivals of Fraserburgh was deemed a no go area for us. We were, however, asked to put in writing a promise not to poach any of its players. In fairness, we have rubbed along rather well with them, though the games against them are pretty fierce affairs.

The club is now a registered charity.

== Sides ==
The club runs a men's side, a women's side, youth sides and minis and micros.

The women's side was set up in 2019. They play in the Tennents Light Womans North Competition.

Aside from their home park of James Ramsey Park, the club also have a floodlit training area across the road near the skate park, which is used for winter training. Training is Tuesdays and Thursdays at 7pm.
