= Shetland RFC =

Scottish rugby union club, based in Lerwick

(Scotland) Shetland RFC
- Union: Scottish Rugby Union
- Founded: 1878; 148 years ago
- Location: Lerwick, Scotland
- Ground: North Lochside
- League: Caledonia North Division Two
- 2025–26: Caledonia Division One North, 7th of 7 (relegated)

Shetland RFC is a rugby union club based in Lerwick, Scotland. The men's side currently competes in Caledonia North Division Two. The women's side plays in the Tennent's Women's North League.

== History ==
The club was founded in 1878 and is one of the oldest clubs in the Shetland islands. The club play at North Lochside.

== Women's side ==
Shetland RFC run a women's side, alongside an U18s girls side. Shetland RFC Women were 2019 Tennent's Women's North League champions.

== Sevens tournament ==
The club run an annual Sevens tournament. Billed as the most northerly Sevens tournament in Britain, it is called the May Madness tournament. 2019's event will be on 25 May.
