= Bo'ness RFC =

Scottish rugby union club, based in Bo'ness

- Full name: Bo'ness Rugby Football Club
- Founded: 2011
- Location: Bo'ness, Scotland
- Ground: Bo'ness Recreation Centre ground
- League: Caledonia Midlands Non-League
- 2024–25: Caledonia Midlands Four, 6th of 6
Team kit

Bo'ness RFC is a rugby union club based in Bo'ness, Scotland. The club has been through three known iterations with the third and most recent being founded in 2011. As of 2024 Bo’ness Rugby club became a charity SCIO SCO53667

== History ==
=== Original club ===
There was a rugby union club in Bo'ness in 1900; the Scottish Referee newspaper of 28 September 1900 advertising an open day for the club. The club had its first proper season of fixtures in 1901. Newspaper reports originally state the club first played at Chance Park before they moved to Erngath Park.

It seems likely that the original club did not survive the First World War.

=== 1930s revival ===
The club was formed again for the start of the 1930–31 season, this time playing at Ladywell Park. The Linlithgow Gazette of 7 November 1930 gave this and also harked back to the turn of the century rugby club in their report:

NEW BO’NESS RUGBY CLUB. The newly-formed Bo'ness Rugby Club may have come into existence somewhat late for this season's rugger but now that they have started, they do not intend to let the grow under their feet. Practice matches are to be played in the immediate future. A fixture-list is to be drawn up. During this week the club secretary received most interesting letter from Mr Wm. Thom, who was captain in the first Rugby club formed in the town. Mr Thom is a director of Messrs Thomas Ovens & Sons. Ltd., Bo’ness and Leith, and now resides in Edinburgh. He takes great interest in Bo’ness and treasures the memory of the former Bo’ness Rugby Club, in the inauguration which took a prominent part. still possesses his club cap and several photographs of the team. It is interesting note that in its first season (1901-02) the former Bo’ness Rugby Club registered 5 wins, 6 losses, and 1 draw. Honorary patrons in those days were— J. H. Lloyd-Verney, H. M. Cadell, D. Dundas. K.C. R. Murray, Alexander Ure, K.C. M.P. Provost Stewart, G. Denholm. W. Easton, James Hogg. Office-bearers were:— President. J. Currie Liddle, vice-president. D. K. Harrower, hon. secretary. Mr James H. Steele, Clifton Cottage, hon. treasurer. G. W. Easton, captain. W. Thom: vice-captain. J. R. Brown. Maroon and dark blue were club colours.

The following season, the club moved to a new ground in Little Carriden, and the same newspaper of 21 August 1931 gave this report:

BO’NESS RUGBY CLUB.— Bo’ness Rugby Club are already getting their house in order for the coming season. The new season will find them in their new quarters at Little Carriden, which has been preferred to Ladywell Park mainly account of the excellent bus service it offers. The club have been admitted members of the Edinburgh District Junior League, and already they have arranged an attractive fixture-list. At Little Carriden an excellent pavilion accommodation has been granted the club by the Muirhouse Cricket Club, who have simply followed in the footsteps of the Bo’ncss C.C., who last season granted the Rugby team the use of their pavilion at Ladywell Park. The new pitch is considered ideal for the game, since it has ample space on each side of the touch-line. The following office-bearers have been elected for the ensuing season: — Hon. president, W. G. Thomson Carriden House; hon. vice-presidents — Dr N. C. Fischer, Fairshiels; Major lan Anderson, Fassiefern; Rev. W. J. Smith, The Manse; T. Thom, Braid Avenue, Edinburgh; and James Tulloch, Linlithgow; president. A. Hope; vice-president, J. B. Ballantine; secretary. Drummond Law. Cadzow Crescent, Bo’ness; treasurer. N. A. Wilkie, jun.; captain, James T. Kidd; vice-captain, J. F. Foot, jun.; committee — W. Wood. W. D. Kidd, W. K. Johnston, W. Allan, S. Upton, and R. Erskine.

It is unknown what caused the demise of either previous iteration of the club as both seem to have gone quiet long before any national turbulence such as the first or second world war.

== Present day club ==
The current iteration of the club began when a group of local rugby enthusiasts met at a local pub led by Steven Paterson to discuss the idea of forming a club for the local community. With things set in motion, the group headed to their local sports direct and purchased two rugby balls and began to organize training sessions at local parks.

Bo'ness RFC raised monies for the My Name5 is Doddie Foundation by having a charity walk up Ben Nevis in 2021. They had originally planned this for 2020 but the coronavirus pandemic changed their plans. The team raised over £6000 for the charity.

As of 2024 Bo’ness Rugby club became a charity which the members and players agreed it would be in the best interest and for the future of the club to stand the passing of time, with the opportunity to give back to the community.

== The Clubs Teams ==
The club runs a variety of teams which include:

men’s 1st team

woman’s team

colts team

6 Primary School teams that compete for the Fair cup every year.

white Rhinos (+35 years old)

primary and secondary school coaching as part of there P.E

and newly formed Purple Rhinos, for renal patients and there family (touch rugby).
