= Crieff and Strathearn RFC =

Scottish rugby union club, based in Crieff, Scotland

- Full name: Crieff and Strathearn Rugby Football Club
- Founded: 1972; 54 years ago
- Location: Crieff, Scotland
- Ground: King George V Playing Fields
- League: Caledonia Midlands Division Two
- 2023/24: 1st (Champions)
Team kit

Official website
- www.crieffrugby.co.uk

Crieff and Strathearn RFC is a rugby union club based in Crieff, Scotland. The Men's team currently plays in Caledonia Midlands Division Two.

== History ==
There was previously rugby at Crieff. At the end of the 19th century there was a club known as St. Michael's Guild Rugby Club from around 1889 which then became Crieff rugby club.

This side went defunct but there was another attempt to create a Crieff rugby club, based around ex-players of the Crieff Academy around 1896.

From the 1920s there was another Crieff club based on ex-Morrisons Academy players. Known as the Morrisonian club or Morrison Academy F.P., the club played to at least the mid-1930s and it seems likely it did not survive the Second World War.

The present club was founded in 1972, and the club celebrated its 50th anniversary in 2022.

In the 2012/13 season, they celebrated their first ever league title as a club. Winning the Caledonia Regional League 4 and going unbeaten throughout the campaign. Their second league title would come in the 2023/24 season in the league above, as Crieff & Strathearn won 13 of their 14 games and finished 11 points clear at the top of the table.

== Sides ==
The club runs a men's and women's side and a minis side (Primary 1–7).

The men train on Tuesday and Thursday nights from 7.00pm to 8:30pm, the minis train on Saturday morning from 9am.

== Sevens tournament ==
The club runs the Crieff Sevens. The teams compete for the Robin McNeil Cup.

== Honours ==
=== Men's ===
- Caledonia Midlands Region League Division 2
  - Champions (1) 2025/26
- Caledonia Midlands Region League Division 3
  - Champions (1) 2023/24
- Caledonia Midlands Region League Division 4
  - Champions (1) 2012/13
- Crieff Sevens
  - Champions (1): 1986
