= Rosyth Sharks =

Scottish rugby union club, based in Rosyth

Rosyth Sharks RFC
- Full name: Rosyth Sharks Rugby Football Club
- Founded: 1999 (as Fife Southern RFC); 2017 (as Rosyth Sharks)
- Location: Rosyth, Scotland
- Ground: Harley Street Park
- League: Caledonia Midlands Three
- 2024–25: Caledonia Midlands Two, 9th of 9 (relegated)
Team kit

Official website
- www.pitchero.com/clubs/fifesouthernrfc

Rosyth Sharks is a rugby union club based in Rosyth, Scotland. The Men's team currently plays in Caledonia Midlands Three.

== History ==
The club known as Fife Southern was created in 1999 when two rugby clubs merged. The Rosyth and District rugby club merged with Dalgety Bay rugby club that year.

The Fife Southern club later rebranded as Rosyth Sharks. This change of name was incorporated with Companies House on 25 July 2017.

The Rosyth Sharks state the reason why they changed the name: "In 2018 the club took the decision to rebrand to Rosyth Sharks RFC as we were the only team playing in the SRU leagues whose name had no affiliation to the town in which it called home."

In March 2021, local youths were charged when they set fire to the clubhouse of the rugby club.

The club organised a fundraiser to repair the clubhouse and raised over £7,000 in 24 hours. By the time the fundraiser closed at the start of July they had raised over £9,000.

== Sides ==
The club has training nights on Tuesday & Thursday 6:30-7:30pm.

Owing to the covid pandemic they are not training minis at the moment.

== Honours ==
=== Men's ===
- Midlands 5
  - Champions (1): 1999-2000
- Caledonia Midlands 3
  - Champions (1): 2018-19
