= Waid Academy FPRFC =

Scottish rugby union club, based in Anstruther

(Scotland) Waid Academy FPRFC
- Full name: Waid Academy Former Pupils Rugby Football Club
- Founded: 1887; 139 years ago
- Location: Anstruther, Scotland
- Ground(s): Waid Park, Anstruther
- President: (Scotland) Kato Berg-Blockley
- Coach: (Scotland) Adam Shaw
- Captain: (Scotland) Niall Hutchison
- League: Caledonia Midlands Three
- 2024–25: Caledonia Midlands Three, 3rd of 9
Team kit

Official website
- www.pitchero.com/clubs/waidacademyfp/

Waid Academy Former Pupils Rugby Football Club is a Rugby Union club based in Anstruther, Fife. They currently play in Caledonia Midlands Three.

Waid are sponsored by The Station Buffet Bar.

== History ==
The Waid Academy Former Pupil's Rugby Club beginnings can be traced back to 1887 when pupils and staff of Waid Academy created what was known as 'The Etceteras' and played their first game in a friendly against Elie. The club has operated endlessly excluding disruptions during the first and second world wars.

Up until the early 60s, the president of the club was also the School's Head Master.

Waid Academy FPRFC still play their home matches at the Waid Academy pitches on the grounds of the high school.

On 2 September 1983, The rugby club's members were able to purchase an old bakery on the Anstruther's High Street and this was transformed into the Waid Academy FPRFC Clubhouse.

== Squad 2024–2025 ==
Hookers (Scotland) Andrew Marley (Scotland) Ben Langlands Props (Scotland) Calum Johnstone (Scotland) Scott Herd (England) James Allen (Scotland) Thomas Murray (Scotland) Duncan Fraser Locks (Scotland) Peter Smillie (Scotland) Stevie McLean (Scotland) Duncan Hogg (Scotland) Cameron Marr (Scotland) Stephen Dickson	Loose Forwards (Scotland) Mark Guthrie (Scotland) Alan Stephen (Scotland) Jamie Sayer (Scotland) Nairn Spence (Scotland) Michael Stockwell Half Backs (South Africa) Nicholas Janse van Rensburg (Scotland) Niall Hutchison (Captain) (Scotland) Dylan Muir (Scotland) Hughes Gillin	Centres (Scotland) Euan Moncrieff (Scotland) Edward Adamson (Wales) Gavin Williams Back Three (Scotland) Michael Dunsire (Scotland) Sandy McIntosh (Scotland) Chris Henriksen (England) Andrew Allen (Scotland) Finley Muir

== Youth development and coaching ==
The Waid Academy FPRFC Modern Apprentice for 2016–17 is David Hodge (Scotland) .

Waid Academy FPRFC run rugby programmes for all Primary School ages. This age group are known as the Waid Pirates and meet on a Sunday during term time at the Waid Academy pitches.

The club also coach those of High School age. There is an S1/2 team, an Under 16's team & an Under 18's team.

In late 2011, UKCC level 2 qualified Club Coach Co-Ordinator Zander Anderson was awarded The Royal Bank of Scotland Club Volunteer of the Month of November in association with Scottish Rugby Union.

Subsequently, in 2014, Richard Dyce was awarded the BT Club Volunteer of the Month for October in association with Scottish Rugby Union.

== Senior Rugby ==
Waid FPRFC run an over 35's team called The Waid Buccaneers.

The Waid Buccaneers won The St Andrews Day Veterans Tournament on Saturday 26 November 2011 held by Madras College FP RFC.

== Waid Academy F.P. Sevens ==
The club run the Waid Academy F.P. Sevens. The Sevens tournament began in 1954; entrants play for the Wilson Cup.

== Honours ==
- Waid Academy F.P. Sevens
  - Champions: 1965, 1981, 1982, 1984, 1989
- Alloa Sevens
  - Champions: 1982
- North of Scotland Cup
  - Champions: 1933

== Notable former players ==
Only one Waid Academy FPRFC player has represented Scotland.

Waid FP John Alexander Davidson gained his first cap for Scotland in 1959 against England National Rugby Union Team. He made three appearances for Scotland and whilst serving on overseas duty with the Royal Air Force (1952–54), captained the RAF Hong Kong XV, and the combined services XV. John also played for the Hong Kong Colony against the Fijians. Having learned his rugby at Waid Academy, John moved on to Edinburgh Wanderers and played for the North & Midlands side in 1958 against an Australian touring team. He also played for Racing Club de France in Paris, the club which is today better known as Racing 92. John was awarded the Honour of Life member of Waid FP Rugby Club in 1997. On the 22 January 2016, John died aged 83.
