= Stobswell RFC =

Scottish rugby union club, based in Dundee

- Full name: Stobswell Rugby Football Club
- Founded: 1963
- Location: Dundee, Scotland
- Ground: Downfield Park
- League: Caledonia Midlands Non-League
- 2024–25: Caledonia Midlands Four, 1st of 6
Team kit

Official website
- www.pitchero.com/clubs/stobswellrfc/

Stobswell RFC is a rugby union club based in Dundee, Scotland. The Men's team currently plays in Caledonia Midlands Non-League.

== History ==
The club was founded in 1963 and grew out of the environs of Stobswell Junior Secondary School in Dundee. Teachers, pupils and former pupils combined to start the club. The club was then known as Stobswell Former Players (Stobswell F.P.) Originally the club played at Caird Park.

The Stobswell club merged with Dundee NCR at the start of the 1970s.

The club won the Midlands District League in 1976 and was promoted to the National League Division 7. They were promoted to National League Division 6 for 1981-82 and played there until 1985–86, after which they were relegated back to Division 7. They were relegated back to the Midlands District League after 1989–90.

The club has links with a Welsh club Treherbert RFC and they have an ongoing bi-annual visit between the two clubs.

== Sides ==
The club trains on Thursday nights at Downfield Park between 7 and 8.30pm.

== Honours ==
- Midlands District League
  - Champions (1): 1975-76
