= Banff RFC =

Scottish rugby union club, based in Banff

- Full name: Banff Rugby Football Club
- Founded: 1978
- Location: Banff, Scotland
- Ground: Duff House playing field
- League: Caledonia North Two
- 2024–25: Caledonia North Two
Team kit

Official website
- www.banffrfc.co.uk

Banff RFC is a rugby union club based in Banff, Scotland. The Men's team currently plays in Caledonia North Two.

== History ==
It was founded in 1978. One of the founders was ex-Highland RFC player George Webster.

The Aberdeen Press and Journal of 21 March 1978 reported:

Another new north-east rugby club, as yet unnamed, has been formed in Banff. At a meeting to constitute the club, officials appointed were: president George Webster, treasurer Keith Newton and secretary Rob McGown. Mr Webster, a teacher at Banff Academy, said yesterday: "We hope to play our first match on April 1st. In the meantime we are holding training sessions in the Duff House grounds on Tuesdays at 6.30pm and Sundays at 2.30pm." Various names have been put forward for the club including Deveron but the favourite is simply Banff rugby club. The question of colours is also being considered.

They play Banff cricket club in a cricket match in an annual event around New Year.

== Sides ==
Banff runs a men's and women's team, with a youth section with minis and micros.

The club, along with the Grampian clan charity, also hope to create 'unified' rugby teams which will allow mentally and physically disabled players to play alongside able bodied players.

== Banff Sevens ==
The club runs a rugby sevens tournament.

== Honours ==
- Banff Sevens
  - Champions (1): 1994
- Caledonia North Two (East)
  - Champions (1): 2016-17
- Ellon Sevens
  - Champions (1): 1980
