= Peterhead RFC =

Scottish rugby union club, based in Peterhead

(Scotland) Peterhead Rugby Football Club
- Union: Scottish Rugby Union
- Founded: 1984
- Location: Peterhead, Scotland
- League: Caledonia North Division Three
- 2024–25: Caledonia North Three
Team kit

Official website
- www.pitchero.com/clubs/peterheadrugbyfootballclub/

Peterhead Rugby Football Club is a rugby union team in Peterhead, Aberdeenshire.

== History ==
Peterhead RFC was started in 1984 in the Scottish town of Peterhead and is one of the youngest clubs in the North-East of Scotland.

== Current status ==
Currently plays in the Caledonia North Division Three.

== Location ==
Peterhead play at the Lord Catto playing fields, near to the Balmoor stadium of Peterhead F.C., and have a capacity for about 400 standing spectators.
