= Helensburgh RFC =

Scottish rugby union team

(Scotland) Helensburgh RFC
- Full name: Helensburgh Rugby Football Club
- Union: Scottish Rugby Union
- Founded: 1963
- Location: Helensburgh, Scotland
- Ground: Ardencaple
- President: Euan Ramsay
- Coach(es): G.Mathieson & B.MacDonald
- Captain: Warren Smith
- League: West 2
- West 3 2025-26: West 3 2025-26 - 1st
Team kit

Helensburgh RFC is a rugby union side based in Helensburgh, Argyll and Bute, Scotland. They play their home games at Ardencaple.

== History ==
The club was founded in 1963 and celebrated its golden jubilee in 2013. The event attracted 400 guests from around the world for a celebratory dinner.

=== Trivia ===
The Helensburgh rugby team made the news in 2004 when their 1st XV all became fathers in the space of 5 years; all of them together having 15 sons; enough for a new 1st XV.

The Princess Royal visited Helensburgh RFC in 2012 and opened a new stand at the ground.

== Helensburgh Sevens ==
The club run the Helensburgh Sevens tournament. This 7s Tournament has been running since 1972.

Year	Winner
2025	Birkmyre (2)
2024	Birkmyre
2023	Glasgow Caledonian University
2022	Glasgow Academicals
2014	Helensburgh (2)
2013	Glasgow University
2012	Greenock Wanderers (2)
2009	Greenock Wanderers
2005	Oban Lorne
1988	Irvine
1987	Clydebank
1986	Glasgow High Kelvinside (2)
1985	East Kilbride (4)
1984	Cartha Queens Park (2)
1983	Cartha Queens Park
1982	Drumpellier
1981	Lenzie (3)
1980	East Kilbride (3)
1979	Lenzie (2)
1978	East Kilbride (2)
1977	Lenzie
1976	East Kilbride
1975	St. Mungo Academicals
1974	Cartha
1973	Glasgow HSFP
1972	Helensburgh

=== Other Sevens ===
The Royal Navy host their Northern Sevens at Ardencaple. Helensburgh are allowed to participate as ground owners; however they can not represent the Royal Navy in subsequent matches. The Helensburgh side reached the final in 2017.

== Honours ==
1971–72 Helensburgh 7s Festival Winners - Russell Davidson Trophy

1972–73 Glasgow District Rugby Union (GDRU) Winners - First formal GDRU Leagues formed - Divisions 1 to 5.

1976–77 Promoted to National League Division 7 - Leagues had been reformed after formation of the SRU (National League Divisions 1 to 7) in season 1973–74 with Helensburgh assigned Division 1.

1977–78 Dunbartonshire Cup Winners

1979–80 Helensburgh 7s Tournament Winners

1987–88 Helensburgh Over 30s Tournament Winners

1987–88 GDRU Division 2 Winners - Promoted to Division 1

1987–88 Dumbartonshire Cup Winners

1994–95 GDRU Division 2 Winners - Promoted to Division 1.

1995–96 GDRU Division 1 Winners - Promoted to National League 7 via 4 way District winners play-offs (Helensburgh, Carnoustie, Orkney, Heriot Watt Uni)

1996–97 National League Division 7 Runners Up - Promoted to NL 6

1997–98 National League Division 7 Runners up - Promoted to NL 5

1998–99 National Div 5 Winners - Promoted to NL 4

1999–00 Oban 7s Winners

1999–00 Strathendrick 7s Winners

2000–01 Loch Lomond 7s Winners

2001–02 SRU National League Team of the Year presented at Murrayfield.

2001–02 National Div 4 Winners - Promoted to NL 3

2001–02 SRU National League Player of the Year - Kieran Verryt (Winger)

2004–05 Clydebank 10s Winners

2010–11 Clydebank 10s Winners

2011–12 SRU National Bowl Winners - Played at Murryfield

2011–12 West Regional Bowl Winners

2011–12 West Region League Division 2 Winners - SRU League reorganisation with Burgh assigned to West League 2

2023–24 West Region League Division 3 Runners Up - Promoted to Division 2

2025-26 West Region League Division 3 Winners - Promoted to Division 2

2025-26 West Bowl Winners
