= Lanark RFC =

Scottish rugby union team

- Full name: Lanark Rugby Football Club
- Union: Scottish Rugby Union
- Founded: 1936; 89 years ago
- Location: Lanark, Scotland
- Ground(s): The Racecourse
- League(s): West Division Three
- 2019–20: West Division Three, 5th in Conf 2
Team kit

Lanark RFC is a rugby union side based in Lanark, South Lanarkshire, Scotland. The club was founded in 1936.

== History ==
The club operate a 1st XV and a youth section for boys and girls. The youth teams are known as the Lanark Eagles.

Four of Lanark's youth team were invited to join the Scottish Rugby Academy.

The infield of the old Lanark Racecourse now hosts Lanark's rugby pitches.

The club secured its first league title in 75 years when it won the West Division 3 championship in 2011.

The club was removed from the West Division 3 league near the end of season 2017–18; but they are back in the league for season 2019–20. The temporary removal was due to not fulfilling five fixtures due to player shortages.

The club now state that they are much better off with players; with numbers over 30 attending training.

== Honours ==
- Lanarkshire Sevens
  - Champions: 1982
- Irvine Sevens
  - Champions: 1982, 1983
- West Division Three
  - Champions: 2011,2012
