= Arbroath RFC =

Scottish rugby union club, based in Arbroath

- Full name: Arbroath Rugby Football Club
- Founded: 1948
- Location: Arbroath, Scotland
- Ground: Arbroath Sports Centre ground
- League: Caledonia Midlands Three
- 2024–25: Caledonia Midlands Four, 4th of 6
Team kit

Official website
- www.pitchero.com/clubs/arbroathrfc

Arbroath RFC is a rugby union club based in Arbroath, Scotland. The Men's team currently plays in Caledonia Midlands Three.

== History ==
There was originally a rugby union club in Arbroath in the 19th century, and although this club was first known as Arbroath RFC, the side quickly changed their name to Arbroath Wanderers. From the Dundee Evening Telegraph of 24 September 1879:

The annual meeting the Arbroath Rugby Football Club was held in the George Hotel on Monday evening, when the following office-bearers were elected :—Peter Mitchell, Captain; James Napier, Lieutenant; David Bruce, Secretary and Treasurer, Street; and Alexander Greig, Alexander M'Gregor, James Kinnimont, and William Dickson, members of Committee. It was also agreed to change the name of the Club to that of the Wanderers. And as the Club has arranged for several good matches some well-contested games may be expected.

That season Arbroath Wanderers were found playing cricket and association football; but not rugby union - and it is likely that the name switch of Arbroath RFC to Arbroath Wanderers was pre-empted by a change of sport.

In 1948 an Arbroath rugby union club was again mooted; the Broughty Ferry Guide and Advertiser of 8 May 1948 concluding:

RUGBY CLUB MOVE. An effort is to be made to stimulate interest in rugby football in Arbroath. It is believed that there are a number of enthusiasts in the town district to justify the formation of an Arbroath Rugby Club. It was decided form a club at a meeting held in High School on Monday evening. The move has been instigated by School former and present pupils, but is intended to widen the scope to include all who are interested. Another meeting will be held soon to discuss fixtures and to elect office-bearers. The interim committee is R. Tollerto, F Morgan, W. Hutchinson, I. McEwen and S. Mentiply.

There was a notice of another meeting at the start of the 1948–49 season, as reported by the Arbroath Herald and Advertiser for the Montrose Burghs of Friday 3 September 1948.

meeting of the recently formed Arbroath Rugby Club is to be held in the High School on Monday first at 7.30 p.m. A number of attractive fixtures have been offered and the Committee is anxious to make final arrangements. It is hoped, therefore, there will be a good attendance on Monday of prospective players. The organisers feel that if the response is not enthusiastic the project may have to abandoned it would be unfair to the opposing clubs to arrange fixtures which they would not be in position to fulfil.

The club shares its clubhouse with the Arbroath Cricket Club.

== Sides ==
The club trains weekly on Thursdays at 6:30pm at McDonald park.
