= Carnoustie HSFP =

Scottish rugby union club

- Full name: Carnoustie High School Former Pupils Rugby Football Club
- Founded: 1977
- Location: Carnoustie, Scotland
- Ground: Carnoustie High School ground
- League: Caledonia Midlands Non-League
- 2024–25: Caledonia Midlands Two, 1st of 9
Team kit

Official website
- www.carnoustierugby.org.uk

Carnoustie HSFP is a rugby union club based in Carnoustie, Scotland. The Men's team currently plays in Caledonia Midlands Non-League.

== History ==
It was founded in 1977 as a former pupils club, though it is now an open club. A previous Carnoustie Dalhousie rugby club dates from 1932, having their first game on 6 February 1932, but it did not survive the Second World War.

The club trains twice weekly at the Carnoustie High School.

It uses the Kinloch Arms Hotel in Carnoustie as its clubhouse.

The club finished top of the Midlands 2 league in the 2019–20 season, but there was no official champion due to the COVID-19 pandemic which curtailed the season. There were no fixtures in 2020–21 season for the club.

The club president Colin Murray won the Scottish Rugby Union's Inspiration award for Caledonia Midlands in June 2021.

== Sides ==
Carnoustie runs various sides from Micros to Over 35s.

== Carnoustie Beach rugby ==
The club runs a Beach rugby tournament which began in 2017. The teams are 5-a-side with 5 substitutions. There are 3 draws: Men's, Over 35s, and Women's.

== Honours ==
- Caledonia Midlands 2
  - Champions (1): 2014-15
