= Clydesdale RFC (South Lanarkshire) =

Scottish rugby union club, based in Stonehouse

(Scotland) Clydesdale
- Full name: Clydesdale Rugby Union Football Club
- Union: Scottish Rugby Union
- Nickname: The Dale
- Founded: 1977; 49 years ago
- Location: Stonehouse, South Lanarkshire, Scotland
- Region: South Lanarkshire
- Ground(s): Alexander Hamilton Memorial Park, Stonehouse
- President: (Scotland) Larry Walker
- Coach: (Scotland) David Deuchar
- Captain: (Scotland) Adam Deuchar
- League: West Division Three
- 2025–26: West Non-League
1st kit	2nd kit

Clydesdale RFC are a South Lanarkshire rugby union club who compete in the West Division Three of the Scottish Rugby Union leagues. They are currently expanding their Senior and Junior rugby set-ups.

== Formation ==
The rugby club was formed in 1977 as a rugby team of the HMRC Centre 1 in East Kilbride, South Lanarkshire.

=== Move to Hamilton ===
The club then moved to Hamilton, South Lanarkshire, in 1980. It changed its name to Clydesdale RFC and played its home matches in Strathclyde Park. It joined Glasgow District in season 1981–82.

=== Move to Larkhall ===
Due to the Strathclyde Park redevelopment work in the 1990s the club relocated to Larkhall and played their home fixtures at Hareleeshill Sports Barn.

=== Move to Stonehouse ===
The club is now based in Stonehouse, South Lanarkshire. They play at the Alexander Hamilton Memorial Park.

== Clydesdale Sevens ==
The club run the Clydesdale Sevens tournament.

== Honours ==
Glasgow District Division 2.

Champions 1986–1987

The club went undefeated for a period of two years from October 1985 to October 1987.

BT West Division 4.

Champions 2008-2009

Runners-Up 2014-2015

Dumbarton Sevens

Winners: 1988

== Committee ==
As of 21 June 2021.

Position	Name
President	Larry Walker
Secretary	Jacqui Hayton
Fixtures Secretary	Craig Wilson
Treasurer	Gordon Bennie
Interim Head Coach	David Deuchar
Captain	Adam Deuchar
Vice Captain	Darren Hayton
Social Convener	Matt Duffy
Child Protection Officer	Ryan Bennett
