= RAF Lossiemouth RFC =

Scottish rugby union club, based in Lossiemouth

- Full name: RAF Lossiemouth Rugby Football Club
- Founded: 1972
- Location: Lossiemouth, Scotland
- Ground: Pavilion ground
- League: Caledonia North Non-League
- 2024–25: Caledonia North Three, 1st of 7
Team kit

Official website
- www.facebook.com/RAF-Lossiemouth-Owls-RUFC-110203577905/?ref=page_internal

RAF Lossiemouth RFC is a rugby union club based in Lossiemouth, Scotland. The Men's team currently plays in Caledonia North Non-League.

== History ==
=== First side ===
There was a rugby club in Lossiemouth from 1929. The Aberdeen Press and Journal of 9 August 1929 reporting:

RUGBY CLUB FOR LOSSIE. A movement is on foot to form a rugby club in Lossiemouth. Several good players are available, and all that necessary is financial aid. Interest in the game spreading through the county.

They played their first game on Monday 30 September 1929, with the Aberdeen Press and Journal reporting two days later:

RUGBY AT LOSSIEMOUTH. Homesters Victory Over Elgin Team. The first Rugby football ever staged in Lossiemouth was played Monday evening between local tiftoen and an Elgin Academy team, and resulted in a victory for the homesters. Throughout the game Elgin's pack-work was consistently good, and their forwards showed well against the heavier Lossiemouth players. In the scrum the ball almost invariably went back to Elgin. Made No Mistake. In the first half both sets of three-quarters were hard-worked. In spite of the open nature the play, the visitors were at first almost wholly confined to their own territory, and it was during this period that all the scoring was done. Watt broke through by himself and touchced down fairly far out for Lossiemouth, but McCulloch failed with the kick. Ten minutes later Hay crossed from rear line, and this time McCulloch made no mistake. Near halftime Elgin had one or two break-aways, which, however, proved fruitless. Individual Effort. After the change over, play was of a freer nature, and individual effort took the place of a great deal of the pack-work. The light Elgin forward line broke away continually, but their three quarters were always stopped just short of the line. The fisal whistle went with the score standing: — Lossiemouth, 8 points; Elgin Academy, 0 points.

It seems likely that this club did not survive the Second World War.

=== RNAS side ===
On the start of the Second World War, Lossiemouth hosted the Royal Navy Air Station. They had a rugby union side and played the local clubs.

=== RAF side ===
The RAF moved into the RNAS site from 1972, and founded the present day rugby union side.

The club missed out on promotion from Caledonia North 3 league; it was top of the league when the Scottish Rugby Union declared the season null and void due to the coronavirus pandemic.

== Sides ==
The team has a strong contingent of RAF players but they also accept civilians into the side.

The club trains on Tuesday and Thursday nights from 6pm to 7.30pm.

== Honours ==
=== Men's ===
- Strathspey Sevens
  - Champions (1): 1998
- Inverness Craig Dunain Sevens
  - Champions (1): 1991
- Ross Sutherland Sevens
  - Champions (1): 1998
