= Mackie Academy RFC =

Scottish rugby union club, based in Stonehaven

Mackie RFC
- Full name: Mackie Rugby Football Club
- Founded: 1976
- Location: Stonehaven, Scotland
- Ground: Redcloak ground
- League: Caledonia North Conference
- 2024–25: Caledonia North Two, 4th of 8
Team kit

Official website
- www.mafprfc.org

Mackie RFC is a rugby union club based in Stonehaven, Scotland. The Men's team currently plays in Caledonia North Conference.

== History ==
It was founded in 1976 as a former pupils club, though it is now an open club. It provides rugby for the Stonehaven, the Mearns and south Aberdeenshire area.

There are two rugby pitches at the Redcloak site where they are based but the club were told to vacate one of their pitches and their lease was terminated for its use. The rugby club was unsuccessful in its bid to buy this second pitch.

Mackie RFC as of 2021 have 6 years of the lease left on the remaining Redcloak pitch. They have proposed buying the grounds off Forest Drive, at Mill O' Forest, to Stonehaven and District Community Council, and the club's bid is at public consultation.

The club boasts to be the 2nd biggest in Scotland in terms of membership; with 1200 members, including 375 youngsters.

== Sides ==
Mackie runs various sides from Primary 1s to Over 35s. Women's and girls sides have been launched.

To encourage younger participation it runs a Mackies Minis tournament which is the largest in north east Scotland. It has 12 clubs and over 700 children attend the event.

There is also a senior team called the Mammoths: taken from Middle Aged Men Mainly Over the Hill.

The Women's team, named the Mackie Vixens, started in early 2022 and competed in the Caledonia North League Division 3 for the 2023/24 season.

== Mackie Academy Sevens ==
The club runs a rugby sevens tournament.

== Honours ==
- Garioch Sevens
  - Champions (1): 1986
- Huntly Sevens
  - Champions (1): 2019

== Notable former players ==
Mark New who played in the Super 6 with Stirling County and represented Scotland at Under 20s played with Mackie RFC at youth level.

Harris Mitchell has been named as part of the 2021–22 season's intake for the Scottish Rugby Academy.
