= Dyce RFC =

Scottish rugby union club, based in Dyce

(Scotland) Dyce RFC
- Full name: Dyce Rugby Football Club
- Founded: 1983; 43 years ago
- Location: Dyce, Scotland
- Ground: Central Park
- League: Caledonia North Division Three
- 2025–26: Caledonia North Division Three, 3rd of 5
Team kit

Official website
- www.dycerfc.com

Dyce RFC is a rugby union club based in Dyce, Aberdeen, Scotland. The Men's team currently plays in Caledonia North Division Three.

== History ==
The club was founded in 1983. Atholl Garden, Steve Holmes and Gus McVey combined to start the club:- Atholl Garden was a Physical Education teacher at Dyce Academy; Steve Holmes a Financial Director of Loffland Brothers; and Gus McVey was the Manager of the local Bank of Scotland branch in Dyce. Gus McVey unfortunately died in 2019, aged 76.

Quite a few players joined the club from the Dyce Academy School Team that Atholl had coached that was a pretty successful School team. Other players came from the local community, local businesses and there were quite a few Students. The club started off playing friendlies with the first games played from season 1983-84. Dyce RFC were then admitted to the Aberdeen District League, Division 2 and gained promotion to Division 1 a few years later by coming second behind RAF Kinloss. Dyce also that year were runners up to RAF Kinloss in the league cup. Before the formation of the North District League the club played one season in the Midlands District League in ‘87-‘88. Dyce RFC toured regularly to the Isle of Skye and Lerwick every Easter from 1989 - 1994. While Dyce has not won many tournaments they were active participants in the 7s scene, but did win the 10s tournament held by RAF Buchan in 1995.

Dyce RFC changed playing name to WestDyce RFC to promote the area of Westhill and the playing ground Westdyke Leisure Centre. To celebrate the 25th Anniversary, the club had a full day's activity planned on the 15th Aug 2009. There was a President's team made up of all the old players against the current Captain's team, this was played at the Westdyke Leisure Centre in Westhill. It was followed up by a dinner dance which included guest speaker Kenny Milne (Last Scotland hooker to win the Grand slam), comedian Claude Bols and supported by ceilidh ban Whigmaleerie. The Dinner and Dance was held in the Britannia Hotel Bucksburn with a signed Scotland top raffled off to contribute to club funds.

One of the former players returning to play included Mike Brodie who resides in Dubai, he has carried on his refereeing duties with the Arabian Gulf Rugby Refs Association. He has officiated as a '4th Official' at International Matches at 4 Dubai 7s and at the 7s World Cup in Dubai in March 2009 including the Men's Bowl Final and Women's Cup Final.

The club returned back to its original Central Park home in Dyce for the start of the 2010-11 season, and reverted to its former name of Dyce Rugby Club.

A mini-resurgence in the early 2010s saw Dyce lifting the Caledonia Bowl in the 2010-11 season after defeating Aberdeenshire 2XV 33-17 at Kelland's Park, and missing out on league promotion out of Caledonia 3 North by a single point to Aberdeen Uni Medics in the 2012-13 season.

A dip in player numbers in the mid-2010s lead to the club dropping out of the league to concentrate on rebuilding before re-entering the leagues in 2016-17. Despite going close on several occasions, the team went almost 2 years without a win in BT Caledonia 4 North before taking the scalp of Moray 2XV at home in the penultimate match of the 2017-18 season, sparking jubilant celebrations amongst the players and supporters. The club built on this springboard to once more finish runners-up the following 18-19 season, losing out to a strong Peterhead team.

The 2019-20 & 20-21 seasons were voided following the global outbreak of Covid-19, followed by an extensive pause in rugby activities.

The club had a short stint at Westhill but now play in the town of Dyce. Dyce don't as yet have their own clubhouse; and their home matches take place on the council run pitches behind the local Asda supermarket. The club actively use snap sponsorship to recruit club sponsors.

The club has its own tartan, which was commissioned and designed to celebrate its 35th anniversary.

== Sides ==
Dyce train every Tuesday and Thursday nights from 6.30pm to 8pm.

== Honours ==
=== Men's ===
- Caledonia Bowl
  - Champions (1): 2010-11
