= Caithness RFC =

Scottish rugby union club

(Scotland) Caithness RFC
- Full name: Caithness RFC
- Founded: 1962
- Location: Thurso, Scotland
- Ground(s): Millbank
- Coach(es): George Sutherland
- League(s): Caledonia North Conference
- 2024–25: Scottish National League Division Three, 10th of 12 (relegated)
Team kit

Caithness Rugby Football Club is a rugby union club from Thurso that compete in the Caledonia North Conference league.

== History ==
The club was founded in 1962. It opened to over 400 fans to play an Edinburgh select side.

George Sutherland has been appointed Head Coach for the season 2019–20.

== Teams ==
Caithness currently run a Men's side; an Under 18 side; boys youth sides and girls youth sides.

The women's side is called the Caithness Krakens.

== Caithness Sevens ==
The club run the Caithness Sevens tournament.

A women's sevens event was run for the first time in 2022, with the Caithness Krakens winning.

== Honours ==
=== Men ===
- Caithness Sevens
  - Champions: 1985, 1987, 1991, 1993
- Highland District League
  - Champions (1): 1972-73
- North District League
  - Champions (1): 1991-92

=== Women ===
- Caithness Sevens
  - Champions: 2022

== Notable players ==
=== Scotland 'A' internationals ===
- (Scotland) Tommy McGee
