= Huntly RFC =

Scottish rugby union club, based in Huntly

- Full name: Huntly Rugby Football Club
- Founded: 1967
- Location: Huntly, Scotland
- Ground: Gordon School playing fields
- League: Caledonia North Three
- 2024–25: Caledonia North Three, 4th of 6
Team kit

Official website
- www.pitchero.com/clubs/huntly/

Huntly RFC is a rugby union club based in Huntly, Scotland. The Men's team currently plays in Caledonia North Three.

== History ==
Huntly RFC was founded in 1967; and began their fixtures for the 1967–68 season. The Aberdeen Press and Journal of 25 August 1967 reporting:

The birth of Huntly, a new North-east club. Is sufficient to add a dash of novelty to the start of the 1967-68 rugby season a week tomorrow. At Huntly, they recognise that it will take them time and considerable amount of effort and devotion make an impression. But the right ingredients are there. In officials lan Archibald (ex-Musselburgh), Dan Thomson (Daniel Stewart's) and Dr. McBoyle (Aberdeen University) the urge is strong to put Huntly on the rugby map as soon as possible. Captain John Boyd, a prop forward, and vice-captain Bill Murray, a stand off, both formerly of the Moray club, have the experience and enthusiasm necessary to guide the club along the right lines. With a membership of around 30 to 40 Huntly will field two teams. From the moment the idea was born Huntly received every encouragement from the town council. Market Muir, with its pavilion is at their disposal, and it is there that the area will get its first taste of district rugby. The match? Highland Select versus Aberdeen Select. The date? September 28 at 4.30pm.

In 2019, Huntly RFC received a £34,000 grant from the Scottish Rugby Union in 2019. The fixture secretary at Huntly, Helen Cameron, stated:

"The sustainability award will make such a difference to us. We do not have a permanent pitch of our own at the moment which does create quite a few issues, especially during the winter months when daylight is limited. The pitch we are using has minimal lighting which means that only a small portion of it can be used during the winter. The new lights we are planning will enable us to use the pitch to its potential and protect the grass as we will not be constantly training on the same section. It will also allow for more varied training with a larger area being accessible to the club."-Zac Lamberton

The club was also eligible for a hardship fund from the SRU due to the coronavirus pandemic in 2020.

The club made BBC headlines when a video surfaced of Huntly Ladies and Peterhead Ladies pushing an ambulance from the mud, to get an injured Peterhead player to the hospital in November 2019. The Scottish Ambulance Service later tweeted its thanks: "Thanks to the team for the assistance on the way out, it was greatly appreciated."

== Sides ==
Huntly runs youth sides, a Men's side and a Ladies' side.

== Sevens ==
The club runs the Huntly Sevens tournament.

== Honours ==
- North District League
  - Champions (1): 2002
- Aberdeen District League
  - Champions (1): 1996
- Aberdeen District Cup
  - Champions (1): 1996
- Strathbogie Trophy
  - Champions (1): 1996
