= Lochaber RFC =

Scottish rugby union team

(Scotland) Lochaber RFC
- Full name: Lochaber Rugby Football Club
- Union: Scottish Rugby Union
- Founded: 1969; 57 years ago
- Location: Fort William, Scotland
- Ground: Banavie
- League: West Division Two
- 2025–26: West Division Two, 4th of 9
Team kit

Lochaber RFC is a rugby union side based in Fort William, Scotland. The club was founded in 1969. They play at the Banavie ground.

== History ==
Founded in 1969 by a group of local rugby loving business men the club played on various temporary pitches over the years until 1984 when the local council commissioned an official rugby pitch (15 years after the Club was reformed).

Over the next three years, work was put in by volunteers to raise funds to build a Pavilion.

The first clubhouse was built with old cabins purchased from the BA at the end of the contract for the new Furnace Room. It was always seen as a temporary measure and in 1997 with the a combination of funding packages the new Clubhouse was opened.

The club fields a 1XV Team, Ladies Team, U18's, U16's and offers rugby to players of all abilities (boys and girls) from Primary 3 upwards. Three female players from Lochaber R.F.C. have International Caps, i.e. Rachael (Nicolson) Whyte, Helen Nelson and Katie Dougan. They have a great reputation for being a small friendly club with refreshments being served to visiting teams after the match .

== Lochaber Sevens ==
The club host an annual rugby Sevens tournament.

== Honours ==
- Lochaber Sevens
  - Champions: 1981, 1987, 1990
  - Bearsden Sevens
  - Champions: 1993
  - West Regional Bowl Winners 2019
