= Aberdeen Wanderers RFC =

Rugby union team in Aberdeen City, Scotland

Coordinates: 57.14053°N 2.17454°W

Aberdeen Wanderers
- Full name: Aberdeen Wanderers Rugby Football Club
- Union: Scottish Rugby Union
- Founded: 1928; 98 years ago
- Location: Aberdeen, Scotland
- Ground: Groats Road
- President: Matthew Allen
- Captain: G. W. Gauntlett
- League: Caledonia League Division Three North

Official website
- www.aberdeenwanderers.com

Aberdeen Wanderers Rugby Football Club is a Scottish rugby union club. It was founded in Aberdeen in 1928 as Aberdeen Engineers RFC, acquiring its current name in 1934.

Its most notable player to date is Jason White who started with the club and progressed to captain Scotland.

== History ==
In 1928 a new club called the Aberdeen Engineers RFC was formed by Tom Richardson a surveyor for Lloyds Register and Ernest W.H.Knight a naval architect who worked for Hall Russell shipyards in Aberdeen and later became their general manager and Wanderers longest serving President (22 seasons).

The inaugural meeting for the formation of the club was held at the Douglas Hotel on the 13th of January 1928. Part of the founding members and a player in the first team in the early years was the famous Aberdonian actor Andrew Cruickshank.

The first honorary president was Lord Provost Sir Andrew Lewis of the John Lewis Shipbuilding family who held the honorary role for approximately 20 years. The first active president was Major A.B. McPhail early in 1928 and then Tom Richardson took over the role for the 1928-29 first formal season in the leagues. The club was open to players who worked for engineering companies in Aberdeen at the time.

The first competitive match was played against Aberdeenshire RFC at Rubislaw on the 25th of February 1928 and was captained by J.Martin.

Groats Road near to Hazlehead Park has been the home ground of the club since 1928. The first match was played there on the 29th of September 1928 against Gordonians RFC and was captained by George McAra.

== Change of Name and Mergers ==
The club later changed its name to Aberdeen Wanderers in 1934. At that time Wanderers were one of the few teams to be open, as the city clubs were mainly closed with membership only open to former pupils of a school or University.

In 1948 a separate club Aberdeen Centralians RFC, was formed for former pupils of Aberdeen Central School, which later became Aberdeen Academy (now Hazlehead Academy). Consequently, the club changed its name to Aberdeen Academicals RFC.

In 1971 Wanderers and Academicals merged to form Aberdeen Wanderers Academicals RFC. In 1990 the club merged with local side Granite City RFC (who were formed in 1975), with the club reverting to its former name of Aberdeen Wanderers RFC.

== Location ==
The club is based at Groats Road, by Hazlehead Park in Aberdeen where is currently has two pitches and a pavilion called "The Jason White Pavilion". In 2023 the facilities were expanded to include 2 additional changing rooms and an external cafe container.

== Youth Section ==
The Youth section, which was formed in 1990–91 season, has a large member base and currently fields teams from Under 13s to Under 18s and for primary aged children. An Under 15s and Under 18s girls section was started in 2015, the first in Aberdeen city.

== Representative and International Players ==
Over the years the club has played at various levels within and before Scotland's National league structure. They have had players represent the North of Scotland, Caledonia (previously North & Midlands), and North District.

Aberdeen Wanderers players who played representative rugby are:

- Francis Pinquet - North v South Africa 1951
- Peter G.H.Younie - District Championship 50's
- Gordon R.Ferries - North v Midlands 1951
- Dr Neville Z. Sacks - North v All Blacks 1953
- G.Aitken
- Henry Dickson
- Mike Wolfe-Murray
- Alan Alexander “Sandy” Dinnie
- Jackie Wright
- Ken McLean
- John Cassells
- Bob Annand

Aberdeen Academicals players who have played for North or North & Midlands are:

- Gordon Jessamine
- Jack Kilman
- Donald Halkerston
- Tom Morrice

The Youth Section was started in the 1990 – 1991 season and has constantly grown over the years to such a level where Aberdeen Wanderers now field teams at all age levels. At youth level a number of players have previously been selected for North, Caledonia District and Scotland age groups.

Those from the youth system representing Scotland are as follows:

- Jason P. R. White - Scotland full international (77 caps – 19 as captain)
- George Hunter - Scotland Club XV, Scotland U20s, U18s and U17s including being capped by the Bahamas in 2016 (through ancestry line)
- Ashleah McCulloch - Scotland 7's and Scotland U20s
- Matthew Herbert - Scotland Under 18s Development Squad 2024

Hamilton Burr who came through the youth system has played for Glasgow Warriors and Waikato Rugby in New Zealand. He has also played for the Waikato Chiefs.

The most notable product of the youth system is Jason P.R. White who went on to play for Watsonians, Caledonia Reds, Sale Sharks, Clermont and Scotland. He was also part of the British and Irish Lions tour to New Zealand in 2005. Aberdeen Wanderers is recognised as a Lions Origin club in recognition. The Aberdeen Wanderers club house is named the Jason White Pavilion in recognition of his skills and sportsmanship

== Club Leadership History ==
Below is a record of the club presidents and captains from 1928 to the present.

Aberdeen Engineers (1928–1934)

Year	President	Club Captain
1928	Major A.B. McPhail	J. Martin
1928–29	T. Richardson	G. McAra
1929–30	T. Richardson	H. Wrigglesworth
1930–31	T. Richardson	D. Marr
1931–32	T. Richardson	H.M. Dickson
1932–33	J. A. Lewis	G. Aitken
1933–34	J. A. Lewis	H.M. Dickson

Aberdeen Wanderers (1934–1948)

Year	President	Club Captain
1934–35	J. A. Lewis	R. A. G. Morgan
1935–36	E. W. H. Knight	R. L. M. Gray
1936–37	E. W. H. Knight	D. G. E. Benzie
1937–38	E. W. H. Knight	A.B. Hutchison
1938–39	E. W. H. Knight	A.B. Hutchison
1939–40	E. W. H. Knight	A.B. Hutchison
1945–46	E. W. H. Knight	W.S. Gibb
1946–46	A. H. S. Lewis	W.S. Gibb
1947–48	A. H. S. Lewis	J. Grurg

Aberdeen Wanderers and Aberdeen Academicals (1948–1971)

Year	Aberdeen Wanderers President	Aberdeen Wanderers Club Captain	Aberdeen Academicals Club Captain
1948–49	A. H. S. Lewis	N.E. Hutchinson	R. Duncan
1949–50	A. H. S. Lewis	N.E. Hutchinson	D. Henderson
1950–51	A. H. S. Lewis	N. Crockett & J. Davidson	D. Henderson
1951–52	A. H. S. Lewis	A.A. Dinnie	D. Henderson
1952–53	E. W. H. Knight	A.A. Dinnie	J. Henderson
1953–54	E. W. H. Knight	G.R. Ferries	J. Henderson
1954–55	E. W. H. Knight	N. Sacks	D. Gray
1955–56	E. W. H. Knight	P. Nicholson	D. Gray
1956–57	E. W. H. Knight	J. Wright & C. Moore	S. Smith
1957–58	E. W. H. Knight	D.A. Westland	G. Mortimer
1958–59	E. W. H. Knight	F.G. Lawson & G.F.G. Cowie	G. Mortimer
1959–60	E. W. H. Knight	D. Hodgson & J. Mell & J. Copland	G. Mortimer
1960–61	E. W. H. Knight	W.A. Davidson	G. Mortimer
1961–62	E. W. H. Knight	G. Blackley	G. Mortimer
1962–63	E. W. H. Knight	G. Blackley	T.M.Stratton
1963–64	E. W. H. Knight	D. Mulholand	R.Erridge
1964–65	E. W. H. Knight	D. Mulholand	R.Erridge
1965–66	E. W. H. Knight	A.P. Mathewson	E.Wilson
1966–67	E. W. H. Knight	B.J. Hadden	S. Reamsbottom
1967–68	E. W. H. Knight	B.J. Hadden & W.A. Davidson	L.Hadden
1968–69	N.E.Hutchinson	D.Philip	A.Johnston
1969–70	A.A.Dinnie	W.A.Davidson	B.Conn
1970–71	A.A.Dinnie	N.J.Anand	B.Conn

Aberdeen Wanderers & Academicals (1971–1990)

Year	President	Club Captain
1971–72	J. Porter	B.J. Hadden
1972–73	J. Porter	A. Bruce
1973–74	J. Porter	R.A. Annand & B. Elrick
1974–75	C. Petrie	J. Killman
1975–76	C. Petrie	B. Elrick
1976–77	C. Petrie	D.T. Milne
1977–78	M.L. Berrow	W. Hogg
1978–79	M.L. Berrow	M. Lynch
1979–80	M.L. Berrow	M. L. Snowie
1980–81	M.L. Berrow	M. L. Snowie
1981–82	M.L. Berrow	A.D. Neave
1982–83	M.L. Berrow	A.D. Neave & T.B Simmonds
1983–84	M.L. Berrow	T.B Simmonds
1984–85	M.L. Berrow	G. Gilbert
1985–86	M.L. Berrow	G. Gilbert
1986–87	M.L. Berrow	B. Christie
1987–88	M.L. Berrow	B. Christie
1988–89	D. Kincaid	W. M. H. Glendinning
1989–90	D. Kincaid	W. M. H. Glendinning

Aberdeen Wanderers (1990–Present)

Season	President	Club Captain
1990–91	D. Kincaid	N. Chilcott
1991–92	W. M. H. Glendinning	G. Johnston
1992–93	W. M. H. Glendinning	S. Spence
1993–94	W. M. H. Glendinning	S. Spence
1994–95	W. M. H. Glendinning	A. Wilson
1995–96	W. M. H. Glendinning	A. Wilson
1996–97	W. M. H. Glendinning	F. Selbie
1997–98	W. M. H. Glendinning	F. Selbie
1998–99	W. M. H. Glendinning	W. Corby & S. Liddle
1999–00	W. M. H. Glendinning	A. Thom
2000–01	F. Selbie	G. Parslow
2001–02	F. Selbie	G. Parslow
2002–03	D. Simpson	E. Smeaton
2003–04	D. Simpson	E. Smeaton
2004–05	J. Currie	S. Davies
2005–06	J. Currie	S. Davies
2006–07	J. Currie	S. Davies
2007–08	S. Nixon	D. Hurst
2008–09	S. Nixon	D. Hurst
2009–10	S. Nixon	M.W.S. Sisson
2010–11	S. Nixon	A. Muirhead
2011–12	S. Nixon	A. Muirhead
2012–13	S. Nixon	L. Henderson
2013–14	S. Nixon	S. Fox
2014–15	B. Mullins	S. Fox
2015–16	B. Mullins	J. Watt
2016–17	B. Mullins	J. Watt
2017–18	G. Mullinor	J. Watt
2018–19	G. Mullinor	M.D. Mackay-Scott
2019–20	G. Mullinor	C. Walker
2020–21	G. Mullinor	C. Walker
2021–22	G. Mullinor	F.S. Christie & D. Coull
2022–23	G. Mullinor	S. Byars
2023–24	M. R. Allen	G. Livingstone
2024–25	M. R. Allen	S. Robson
2025–26	M. R. Allen	S. Robson
2026–27	M. R. Allen	G.W. Gauntlett

== 1st XV League Information ==
Year	League	Final position
2013/14 Season	Caledonia League Division 2 North	8th
2014/15 Season	Caledonia League Division 2 North	6th
2015/16 Season	Caledonia League Division 2 North	2nd (promoted)
2016/17 Season	Caledonia League Division 1	8th
2017/18 Season	Caledonia League Division 1	7th
2018/19 Season	Caledonia League Division 1	7th
2019/20 Season	Caledonia League Division 1	4th
2020/21 Season	n/a - Covid	n/a
2021/22 Season	Caledonia League Division 1	8th
2022/23 Season	Caledonia League Division 1	6th (relegated)
2023/24 Season	Caledonia League Division 2 North	8th
2024/25 Season	Caledonia League Division 2 North	6th
2025/26 Season	Caledonia League Division 2 North	4th
2026/27 Season	Caledonia League Division 3 North	

== 2016/17 Season ==
The 1st XV were promoted into the Caledonia League Division 1 at the beginning of the season where team came 8th in the league.

The 2nd XV, known as the Aberdeen Wanderers Warriors development squad, were promoted into the Caledonia League Division 3 North League after the collapse of Division 4 at the start of the season. The Warriors finished 6th in the league.

In Scottish Rugby's Club Youth Red Conference League, the Under 13 to Under 18 teams at Aberdeen Wanderers teamed up with Deeside RFC and played as "Deeside Wanderers". The youth section came 2nd in the Conference overall.

For the Caledonia Youth Regional Competition, Aberdeen Wanderers Under 15s, Under 16s and Under 18s, combined with Aberdeen Grammar Rugby players to form a combined team called "Granite City Colts". The Under 15s and Under 18s teams got through to the semi-final of their cup competitions, where the Under 16s won the Plate in their age group of the competition.

The Under 15 and Under 18 girls combined with other North East Scotland rugby clubs to enter the National Girls Cup Competition as "Grampian Girls Rugby", which saw the Under 15s get to the Cup semi final and the Under 18s to the Shield semi final. Both of these semi final games were played at Aberdeen Wanderers home ground.

== Sevens tournament ==
The club have hosted the Sam Lobban Trophy sevens tournament annually since 2018. It is a charity rugby sevens event in memory of their former player. Proceeds go to Mental Health Charities in Aberdeen.
