= Panmure RFC =

Scottish rugby union club, based in Broughty Ferry

(Scotland) Panmure RFC
- Full name: Panmure Rugby Football Club
- Founded: 1880; 146 years ago
- Location: Broughty Ferry, Scotland
- Ground(s): The Law; Linlathen Park; Forthill
- League: Caledonia Midlands Division Two
- 2025–26: Caledonia Division One Midlands, 10th of 10 (relegated)
Team kit

Official website
- www.pitchero.com/clubs/panmure

Panmure RFC is a rugby union club based in Broughty Ferry in Dundee, Scotland. They play in Caledonia Midlands Division Two.

== History ==
Panmure was founded in 1880 and joined the Scottish Rugby Union in 1884.

The name Panmure was chosen as many of the club's original members stayed in Panmure Terrace, Dundee.

The club began in Dundee but moved to Broughty Ferry in 1888, as tenants of Forfarshire Cricket Club.

== Panmure Sevens ==
The club began the Panmure Sevens tournament in 1986. Teams play for the President's Trophy.

== Honours ==
- Midlands Rugby Championship (1910–11),(1922–23)
- North of Scotland Cup (1912–13, 1936–37, 1937-38*, 1938-39*)
- National Division 5 Caledonia (2005–06).
- RBS Caledonia 3 Midlands (2011–12)
- BT Caledonia Regional Bowl Midlands (2017–18, 2022-2023)

== Notable former players ==
=== Scotland internationals ===
- (Scotland) Ken Dalgleish
- (Scotland) Gordon Pattullo

=== North of Scotland District ===
These players played for the combined North of Scotland side (which contained Midlands players).

- (Scotland) J. K. Mearns
- (Scotland) W. Robertson
- (Scotland) C. Rennie
- (Scotland) D. Nicoll
- (Scotland) P. A. Watson
- (Scotland) J. Mitchell
- (Scotland) J. K. McIntyre

=== North and Midlands District ===
These players played for the North and Midlands side.

- (Scotland) J. K. Morrison
- (Scotland) D. P. Fullerton
- (Scotland) D. Tully

=== Midlands District ===
These players played for the Midlands District side.

- (Scotland) A. S. Kydd (1938)
- (Scotland) J. R. McKenzie (1921)
- (Scotland) D. Reid (1907)
- (Scotland) R. Cunningham (1907)
- (Scotland) N. A. Gillanders (1936–38)
- (Scotland) J. R. Phillip (1921)
- (Scotland) W. Ovenstone (1907)
- (Scotland) D. P. Mitchell (1907)
- (Scotland) A. I. Abbott (1938)
- (Scotland) A. S. Reid (1907)
- (Scotland) W. A. Robertson (1907)
- (Scotland) J.A.W. Wright (1932)
- (Scotland) Gordon Pattullo (1921)
- (Scotland) P. Watson (1907)
- (Scotland) Charles Cleghorn (1909)
- (Scotland) C. Cunningham (1907)
- (Scotland) L. Graham (1947)
