= Inverness Craig Dunain RFC =

Scottish rugby union club, based in Inverness

- Full name: Inverness Craig Dunain Rugby Football Club
- Founded: 1978
- Location: Inverness, Scotland
- Ground: Culloden Academy
- League: Tennent's Caledonia North Region League Division 3
Team kit

Official website
- www.invernesscraigdunainrfc.com

Inverness Craig Dunain RFC is a rugby union club based in Inverness, Scotland. The Men's team currently plays in Caledonia North Region 3.

Men’s results Icd 12-91 kinloss Man of the match-George forth No8

Icd 34-33 Stornoway Man of the match-Cameron Sharp no4

Icd vs orkeny Icd 42-26 Orkney

Defeating the islands since 2026

2026/2027 Captain Jake geddis

V captain Finlay fouils

Media/team manager euan humphreys

== History ==
The club was founded in 1978, by a nurse manager, Dougie Cruickshanks, who worked in the Craig Dunain Hospital. The name of the club is taken from the former hospital's name. The club used to play in the grounds of the hospital.

After a few successful seasons in the Highland District League the club folded in 1983, only to be re-surrected in 1987 after a Sevens tournament, as The Highlanders.

The women's side began in 1993.

The name of the club was changed to Inverness Craig Dunain in 2004.

The hospital closed in 2000, but the rugby club thought it was appropriate to keep the name. The club played at Inverness High School until 2022.

== Sides ==
The club runs a men's and women's side. Both train on Tuesday and Thursday nights from 7pm at Merkinch Ferry Point.

== Sevens tournament ==
The club runs the Inverness Craig Dunain Sevens. They compete for the Alex Wells trophy.

== Honours ==
=== Men's ===
- Inverness Craig Dunain Sevens
  - Champions (4): 1993, 1995, 1996, 1998
- Ross Sutherland Sevens
  - Champions (1): 1996
- Highland 'A' League
  - Champions (1): 1993
- Highland District League Cup
  - Champions (1): 1993

=== Women's ===
- Mull Sevens
  - Champions (1): 2000
- Shetland Sevens
  - Champions (1): 2015
- Ross Sutherland Sevens
  - Champions: 2022

== Notable former players ==
=== Women ===
==== Scotland ====
The following former Inverness Craig Dunain RFC players have represented Scotland.

(Scotland) Jade Konkel

The following former Inverness Craig Dunain RFC players have represented Wales.

(Wales) Jake “Jakester” Geddis
