= Kinross RFC =

Scottish rugby union club, based in Kinross

- Full name: Kinross Rugby Football Club
- Founded: 1981
- Location: Kinross, Scotland
- Ground: King George V Recreation Ground
- League: Caledonia Midlands Conference
- 2024–25: Caledonia Midlands Conference, 5th of 7
Team kit

Official website
- www.pitchero.com/clubs/kinross

Kinross RFC is a rugby union club based in Kinross, Scotland. The Men's team currently plays in Caledonia Midlands Conference.

== History ==
It was founded in 1981.

The club often organised a half marathon race or a 5 kilometre race to raise funds for the club.

The side have an annual charity match against the Edinburgh Borderers.

The club are hosting a dinner dance as part of the celebrations for their 40th anniversary year.

Senior training is held on Tuesday and Thursday evenings at the King George V Recreation Ground, in inclement weather training is held indoors at the Loch Leven Community Campus.

== Sides ==
Kinross runs various sides including mens, boys, girls, midis and minis.

== Honours ==
- Caledonia Midlands Bowl
  - Champions (1): 2019-20
