= Orkney RFC =

Scottish rugby union club, based in Kirkwall

(Scotland) Orkney RFC
- Full name: Orkney Rugby Football Club
- Founded: 1966; 60 years ago
- Location: Kirkwall, Scotland
- League: Scottish National League Division Three
- 2025–26: Scottish National League Division Three, 9th of 10
Team kit

Orkney Rugby Football Club is a rugby union club located in the town of Kirkwall, Scotland.

== History ==
Orkney RFC was founded in 1966.

In recent years Orkney have progressed through the regional league system to play in Scotland's national league set-up. This was a position they maintained for 4 years.

In season 2018–19, despite beating the Division 3 champions elect Gordonians at the end of March 2019, Perthshire's win at Caithness ensured that Orkney would be relegated back into the regional league system.

== Women's side ==
The club run a women's side.

== Orkney Sevens ==
The club run the Orkney Sevens tournament.

== Honours ==
- Orkney Sevens
  - Champions: 1967, 1972, 1973, 1976, 1977, 1980, 1982, 1983, 1984, 1986, 1988, 1989, 1996, 1998, 2001, 2009, 2010, 2012, 2013, 2014, 2018, 2019
- Shetland Sevens
  - Champions: 2008
- Brin Cup
  - Champions (10): 1977–78, 1979–80, 1980–81, 1982–83, 1983–84, 1986–87, 1987–88, 1990–91, 1995–96, 1996–97
- Highland District League
  - Champions (7): 1977–78, 1978–79, 1979–80, 1980–81, 1983–84, 1986–87, 1990–91
- Corstorphine Easter Tournament
  - Champions (2): 1984–85, 1987–88
- Caithness Sevens
  - Champions: 1978, 1979, 1982, 1983, 1986, 1988, 1989, 1992, 1994
- North League
  - Champions (2): 1995–96, 1996–97
- Zanussi Sevens
  - Champions (1): 1995-96
- National League Division 5 North
  - Champions (1): 2001-02
