= Deeside RFC =

Scottish rugby union club, based in Banchory

- Full name: Deeside Rugby Football Club
- Founded: 1977
- Location: Banchory, Scotland
- Ground: Woodend Playing Fields
- President: Bruce Strachan
- Coach: Alan Williams
- Captain: Andy Wilson
- League: Caledonia North 2
- 2022-23: Caledonia North 3, 5th of 12
Team kit

Official website
- www.pitchero.com/clubs/deesiderfc

Deeside RFC is a rugby union club based in Banchory, Scotland. The Men's team currently plays in Caledonia North 2.

== History ==
The club began as Aboyne RFC; but they moved to Banchory in 2011, when 4 new rugby pitches were built. The Deeside name was then adopted to reflect the new catchment area.

The club installed new floodlights in 2014.

The club became a registered charity in February 2017. They have the Scottish Charity Number: SCO47171.

It applied to the council to build a clubhouse in 2019.

== Sides ==
The club takes in Primary 1 to adults, and has around 500 players attending in all ages, male and female.

== Sevens tournament ==
The club runs the Deeside Sevens. It is one leg of the 'Kings of the North' tournament.

== Honours ==
=== Men's ===
- Caledonia North 2
  - Champions (1): 2016
- Caledonia North 4
  - Champions (1): 2022
- Banff Sevens
  - Champions (1): 2019
- Garioch Sevens
  - Champions (1): 1994 (when as Aboyne RFC)
