= Stornoway RFC =

Scottish rugby union club, based in Stornoway

(Scotland) Stornoway RFC
- Union: Scottish Rugby Union
- Founded: 1952; 73 years ago
- Location: Stornoway, Scotland
- Ground: Bayhead
- League: Caledonia North Non-League
- 2024–25: Caledonia North Three, 5th of 7
Team kit

Stornoway RFC is a rugby union club based in Stornoway, Scotland. The men's side currently compete in Caledonia North Non-League. The club play their home matches at Bayhead Park.

== History ==
The club was founded in 1952 by the Scotland international player Bob Bruce - who moved to the town - and a Stornoway engineer John Morrison.

== Women's side ==
The club run also run a women's side.

== Notable players ==
=== Men ===
==== Scotland international players ====
- (Scotland) Bob Bruce

== Honours ==
- Brin Cup
  - Champions (2): 1990, 1997
- Highland District League
  - Champions (5); 5 times between 1996 and 2001
- Highland District League Cup
  - Champions (1): 2001
