= Old College, University of Edinburgh =

Old College, Edinburgh
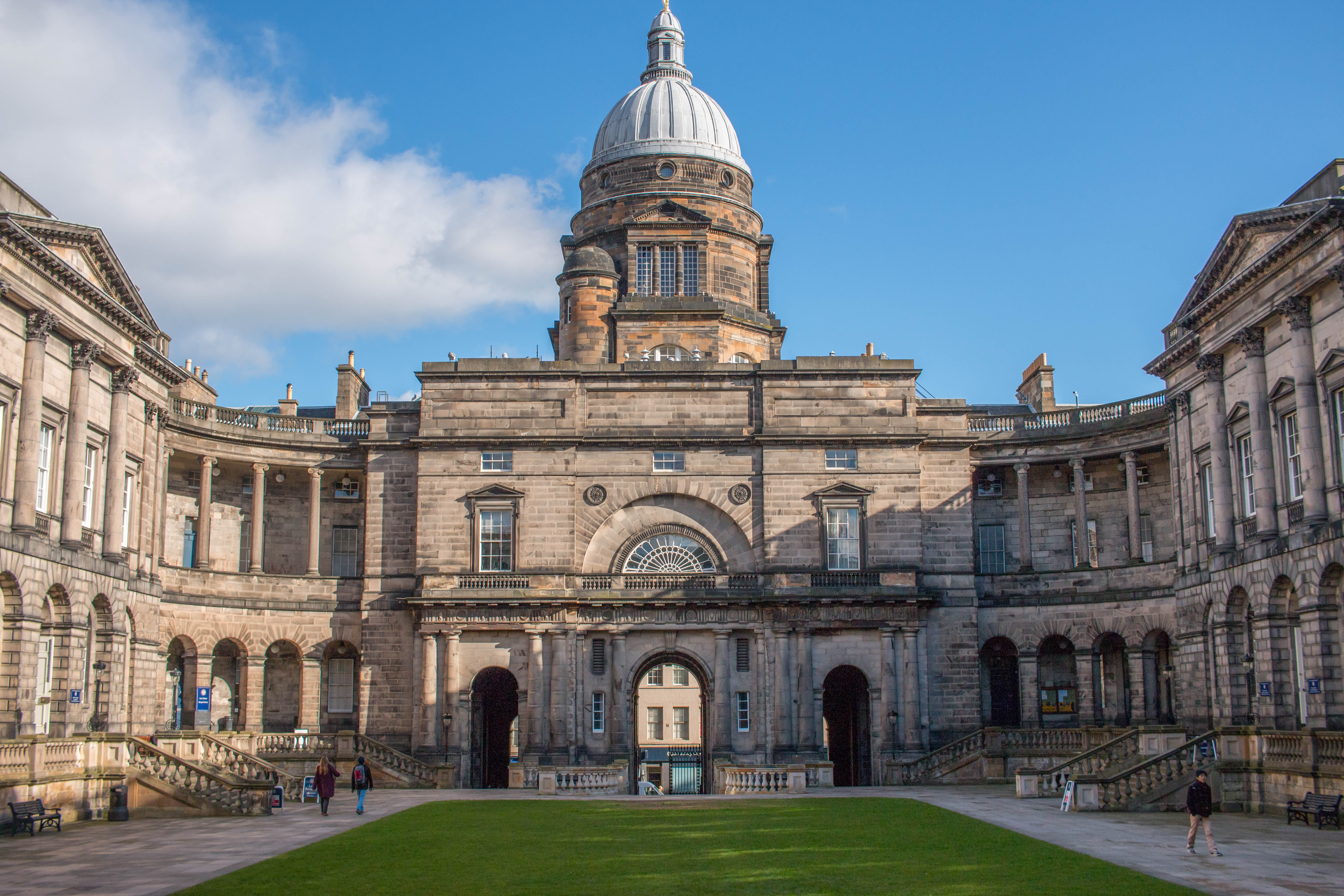
- The remodeled central courtyard, Old College, Edinburgh
- Interactive map of the Old College, Edinburgh area

General information
- Architectural style: Neoclassical
- Location: Edinburgh, Scotland
- Coordinates: 55.9474°N 3.1873°W
- Construction started: 1789
- Completed: 1827
- Owner: University of Edinburgh

Design and construction
- Architects: Robert Adam; William Henry Playfair; Sir Robert Rowand Anderson

Listed Building – Category A
- Designated: 14 December 1970
- Reference no.: LB27989

Old College is a late 18th-century to early 19th-century building of the University of Edinburgh, Scotland. It is located on South Bridge, and presently houses parts of the University's administration, the University of Edinburgh School of Law, and the Talbot Rice Gallery.

Originally called the "New College", it was designed by Robert Adam to replace a number of older buildings previously built on the site of the former Kirk o' Field, and after considerable delays was completed to a modified design by William Henry Playfair, except for the dome added later. It is a Category A listed building.

== History ==
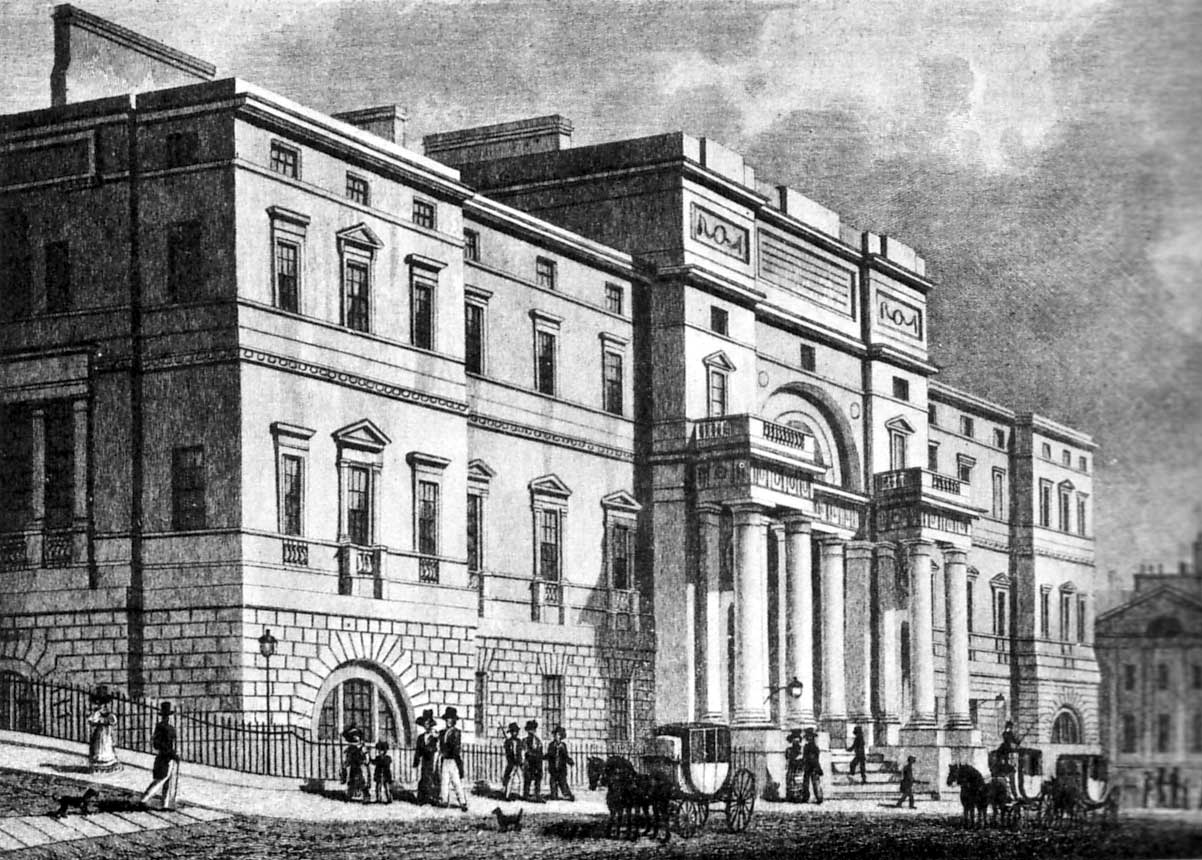
The east facade of the then new College with its formal entrance portico at South Bridge / Nicholson Street, as it was in 1827. A dome similar to Adam's original design was added in 1887.

Efforts by Edinburgh Town Council to build a college led to James VI of Scotland granting a royal charter in 1582 for what became known as the "Tounis College". On a visit in 1617 he expressed a wish that it be called "King James's College" and this became its formal name, but the older title remained in use for the town's college, which was also called Academia and sometimes university.

The college occupied the grounds of the former Kirk o' Field collegiate church, bounded on the south by the Flodden Wall, and on the north by Jamaica Street, about midway down the slope to the Cowgate. On its west boundary, Horse Wynd led to the Potterrow Port. The church itself had extended east from there. Its site formed the main quadrangle, the High College, two smaller quadrangles lay to its north. The old Library formed the east edge of the main buildings, from there the College Gardens extended further east to the Royal Infirmary on the Blackfriars site. By 1763 the university was internationally famous, but the buildings were inadequate and partly in a ruinous state.

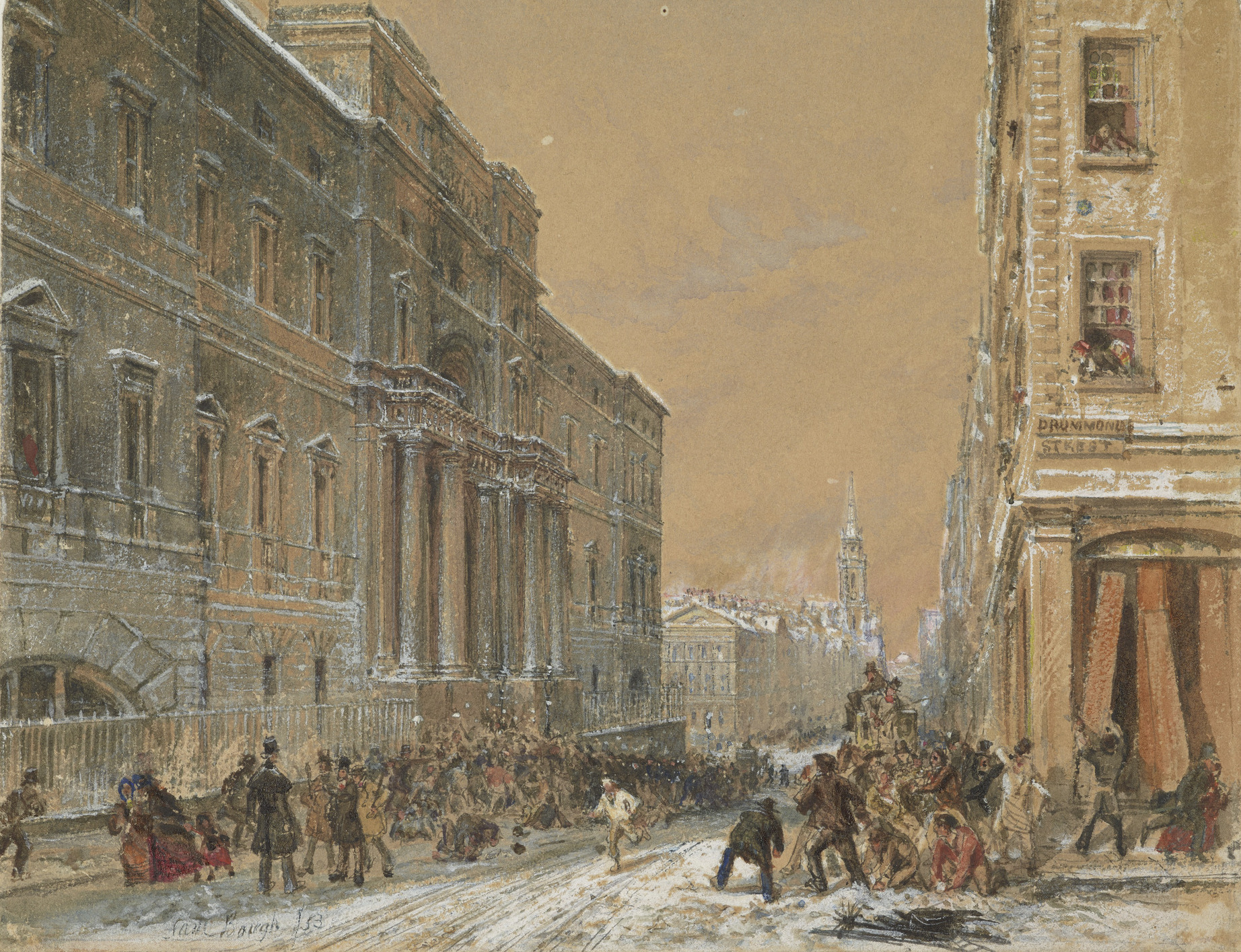
Snowballing Outside Edinburgh University, by Samuel Bough (1853, watercolour on paper)

The Principal of the University William Robertson warned of dilapidation and overcrowding, a pamphlet of 1768 called unsuccessfully for subscriptions to build new teaching-rooms and houses. South Bridge was routed across the College Gardens, in a December 1784 letter Andrew Dalzell wrote "It is now resolved to build a bridge across the Cowgate, passing between the College and the Infirmary. It is thought that when the posteriors of the College are exposed, people will be shamed into building a new College." Soon after this, James Gregory wrote an influential letter to Dundas, which was more successful in raising subscriptions. The South Bridge Act 1785 was passed in the House of Commons of the United Kingdom on 21 April 1785 and in 1789 taxes were raised to fund a new University building in Edinburgh to a plan prepared by Robert Adam.

Adam's plan proposed a building with its main entrance from South Bridge leading to a "First Court", giving access to professor's lodgings, followed by a square Great Court, around which the main academic halls and lecture rooms would be arranged. The South Bridge was built, and opened for traffic in March 1788. The "Foundation-stone of the New College Of Edinburgh" was laid on 6 November 1789, and the old buildings along the north boundary were demolished. The "theatre for dissections", built around 1760 to the east of the library for Professor of Anatomy Alexander Monro (secundus), had been demolished for the bridge. On 31 March 1790 Monro laid the foundation stone for his new Anatomical Theatre at the north west corner of the building, it came into use in October 1792. By then several apartments on the north side were in use, but roofs were incomplete. Progress was slowed by the death of Robert Adam and the outbreak of the Napoleonic Wars. The Roman Doric columns of the portico at the South Bridge entrance were erected, but funds ran out, and by 1793 all work had stopped.

In 1815 further funds were raised, and work recommenced. Plans were submitted by nine architects showing their proposals to continue the design work, with the outcome that William Henry Playfair was appointed architect in 1817. Playfair's design clove close to Adam's but combined the two courts into a single large quadrangle. By 1827 the building was virtually complete with the exception of fitting out the library, and construction of a dome which Adam had proposed at the east end of the building. This was left out as a cost saving, and the work was completed about four years later. The dome was added in 1887, to a design by Sir Robert Rowand Anderson, and funded by a donation from Gorgie industrialist and politician, Robert Cox. The gilded statue of Youth which crowns the dome is by John Hutchison.

The university building, identified for a time as "the New College", was later known as "the College". Theology professor Thomas Chalmers resigned in the Disruption of 1843, and in November gave the inaugural address at the opening of the Free Church College, which became the New College. In the early 20th century the South Bridge university building became known as the Old College. In 1935, following reunion of the Free Church with the Church of Scotland, the university Faculty of Divinity merged into the Free College on The Mound.

The large bronze war memorial at the west end of the quadrangle was designed by Sir Robert Lorimer in 1922 and sculpted by Pilkington Jackson the following year.

The courtyard of the quadrangle was not completed at the time the Old College was originally constructed. However, it was redesigned by architects Simpson & Brown in 2011 and was paved in Hazeldean sandstone, a honey-coloured stone which is a good match for the original Craigleith sandstone. A central grassed area was part of the design. The newly designed courtyard is both a venue for graduation celebrations and festival events, as well as providing a more inviting entrance for the various Old College facilities.

== Gallery ==
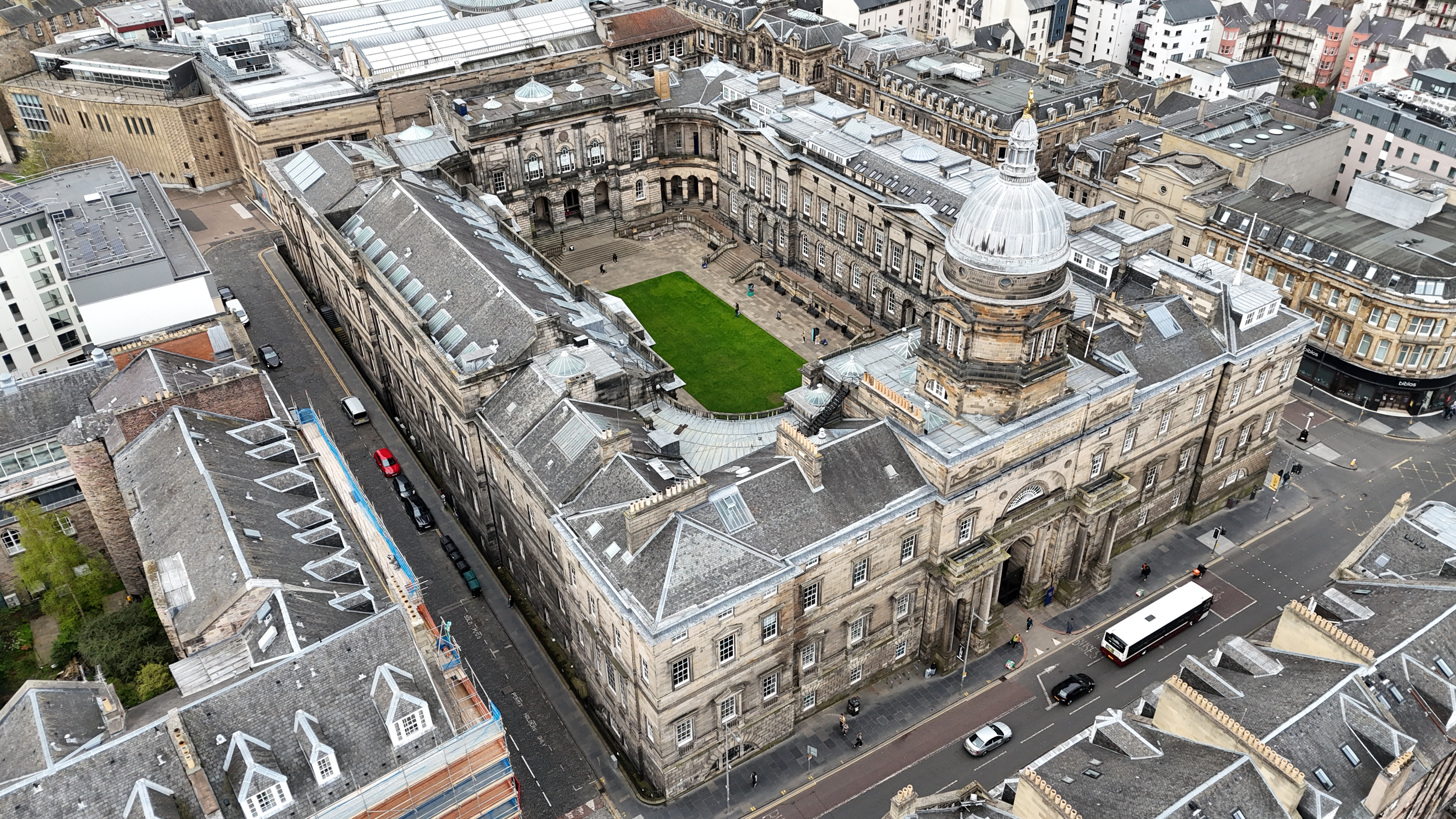
Aerial view

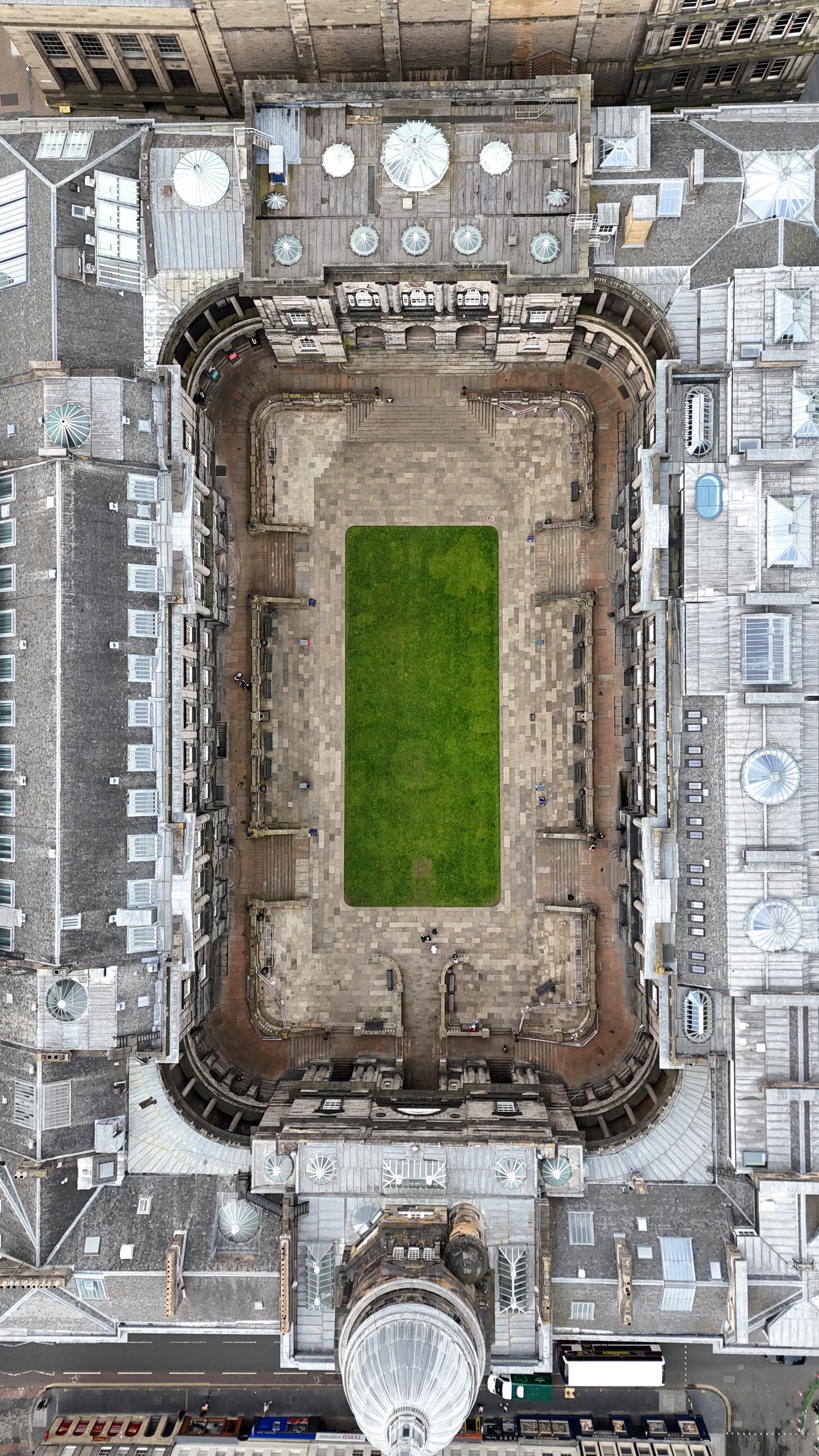
Aerial view

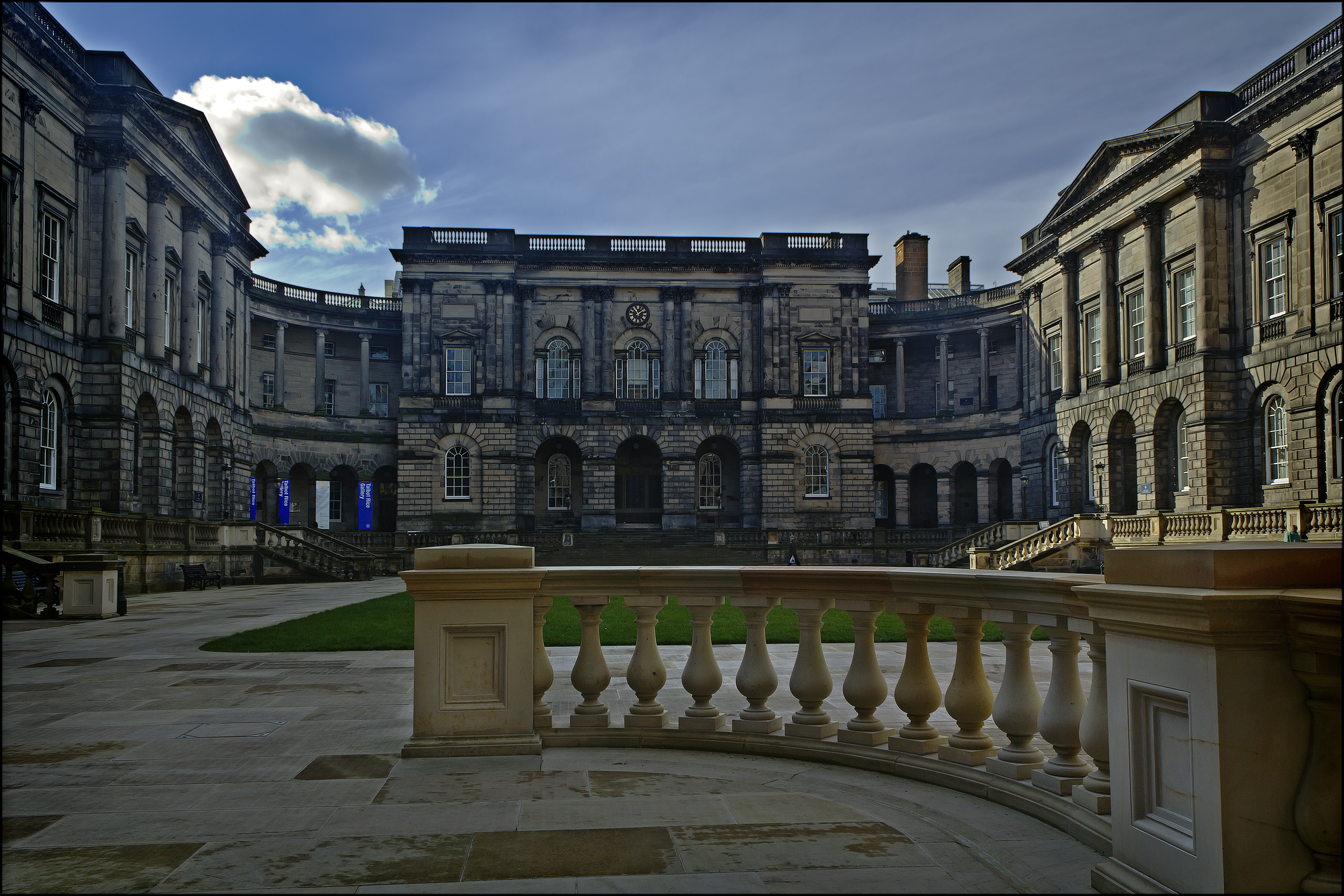
Old College's Neoclassical style

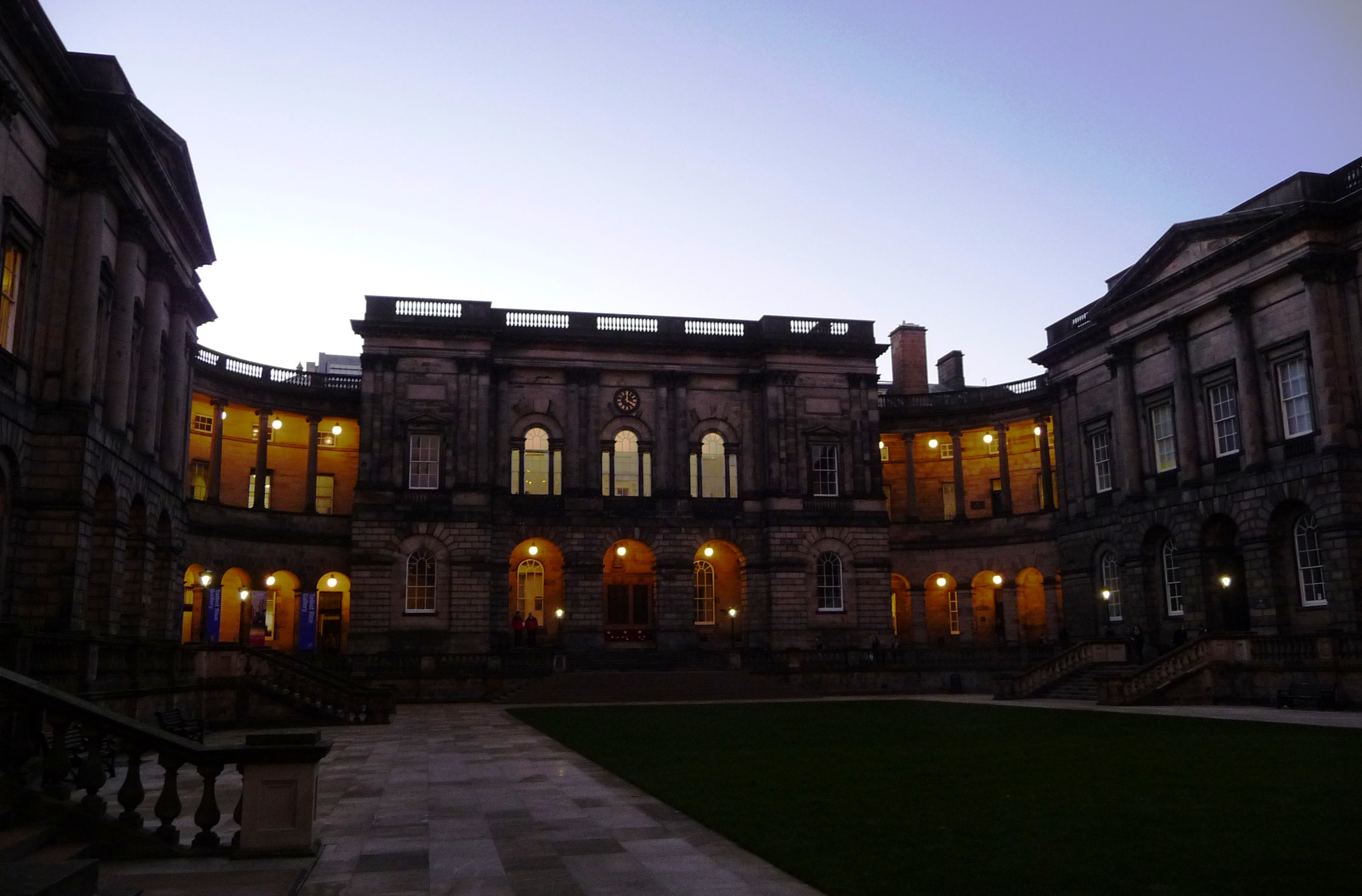
Old College at nightfall

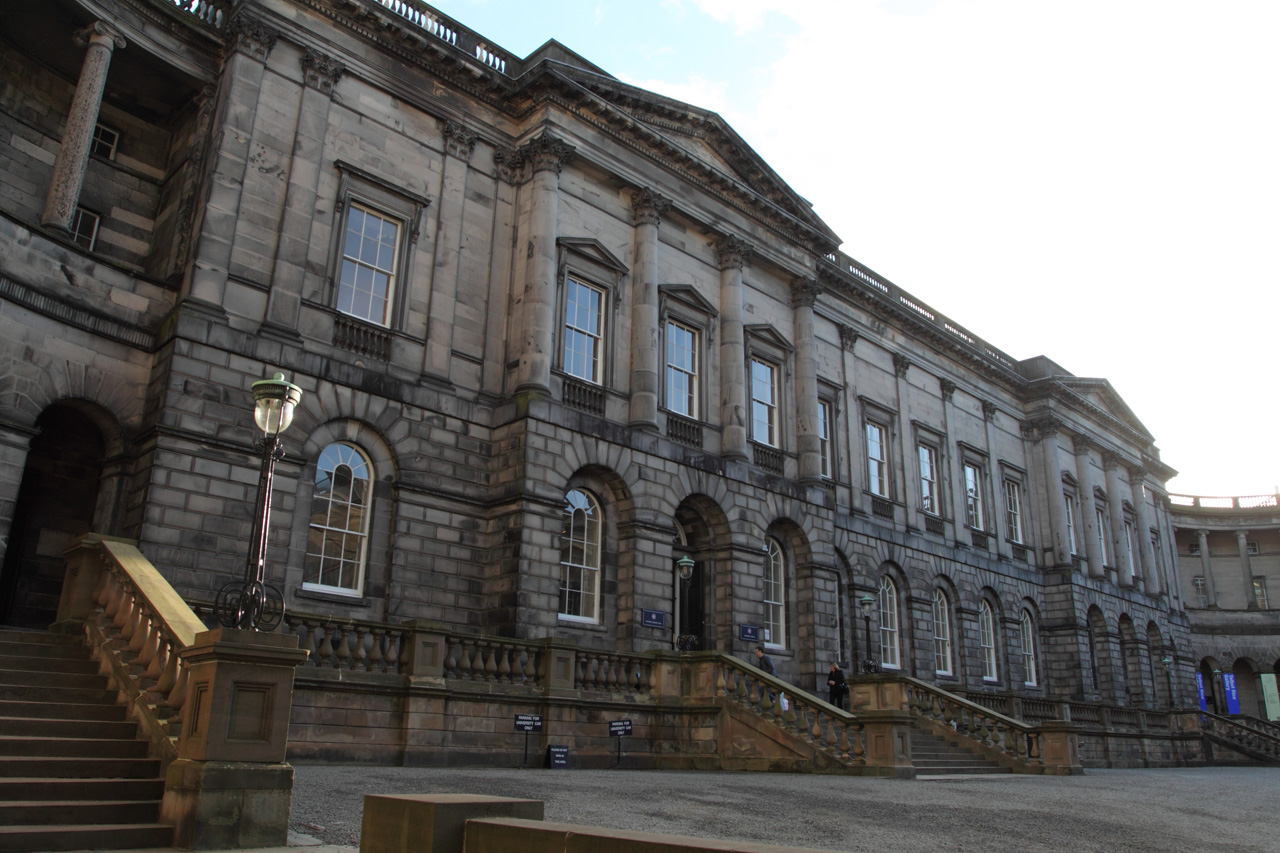
Edinburgh Law School

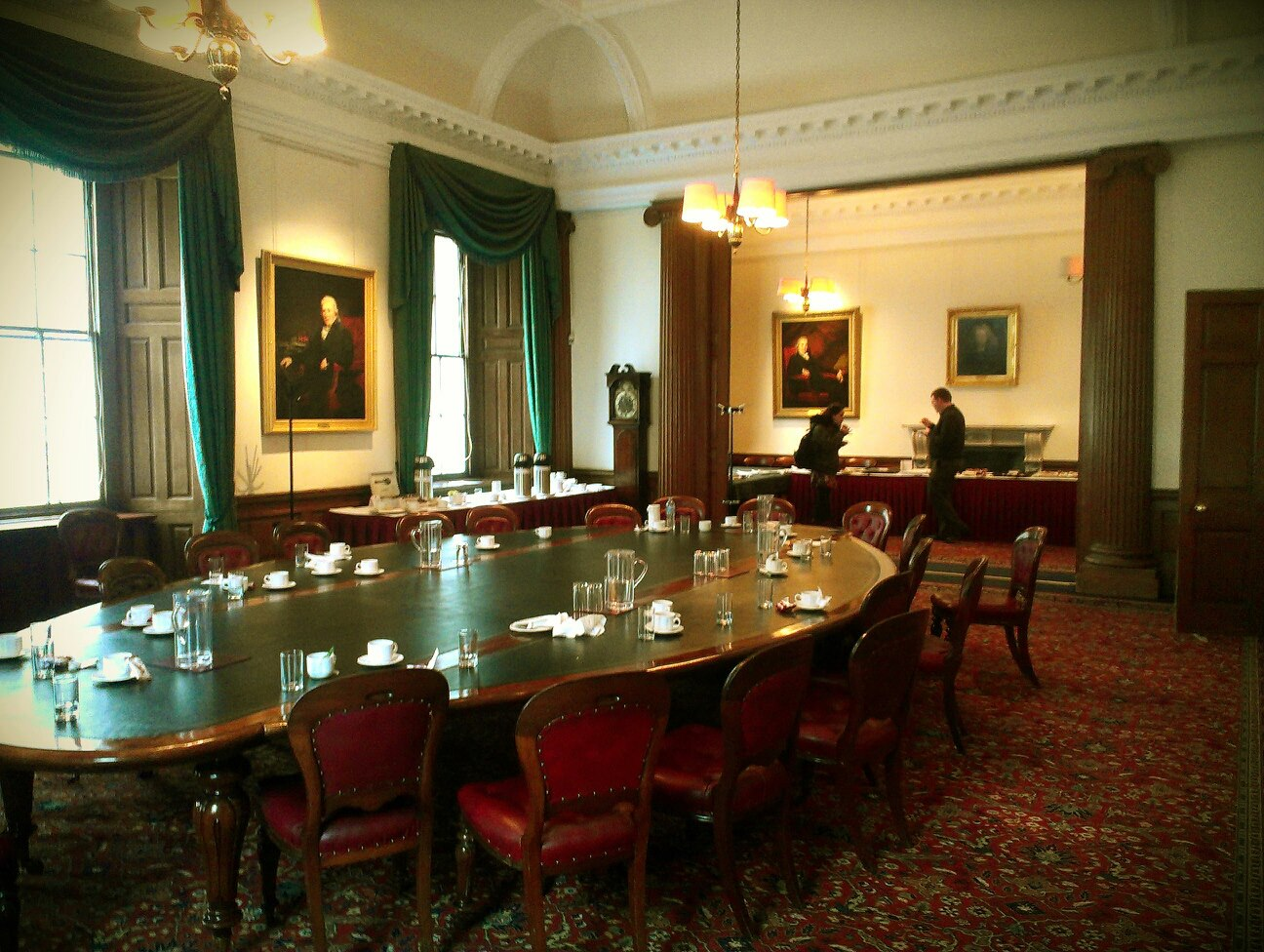
Raeburn Room

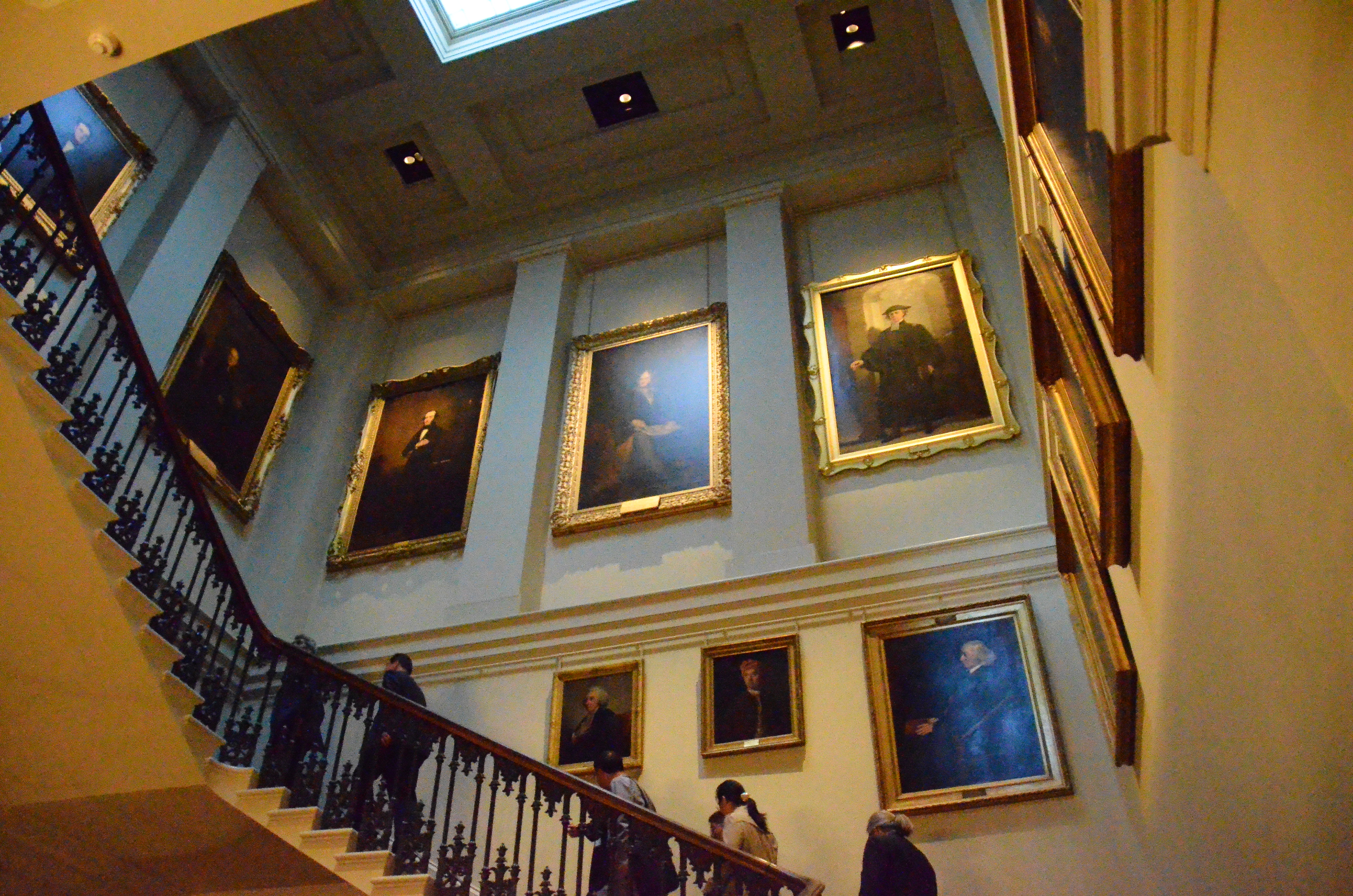
Staircase

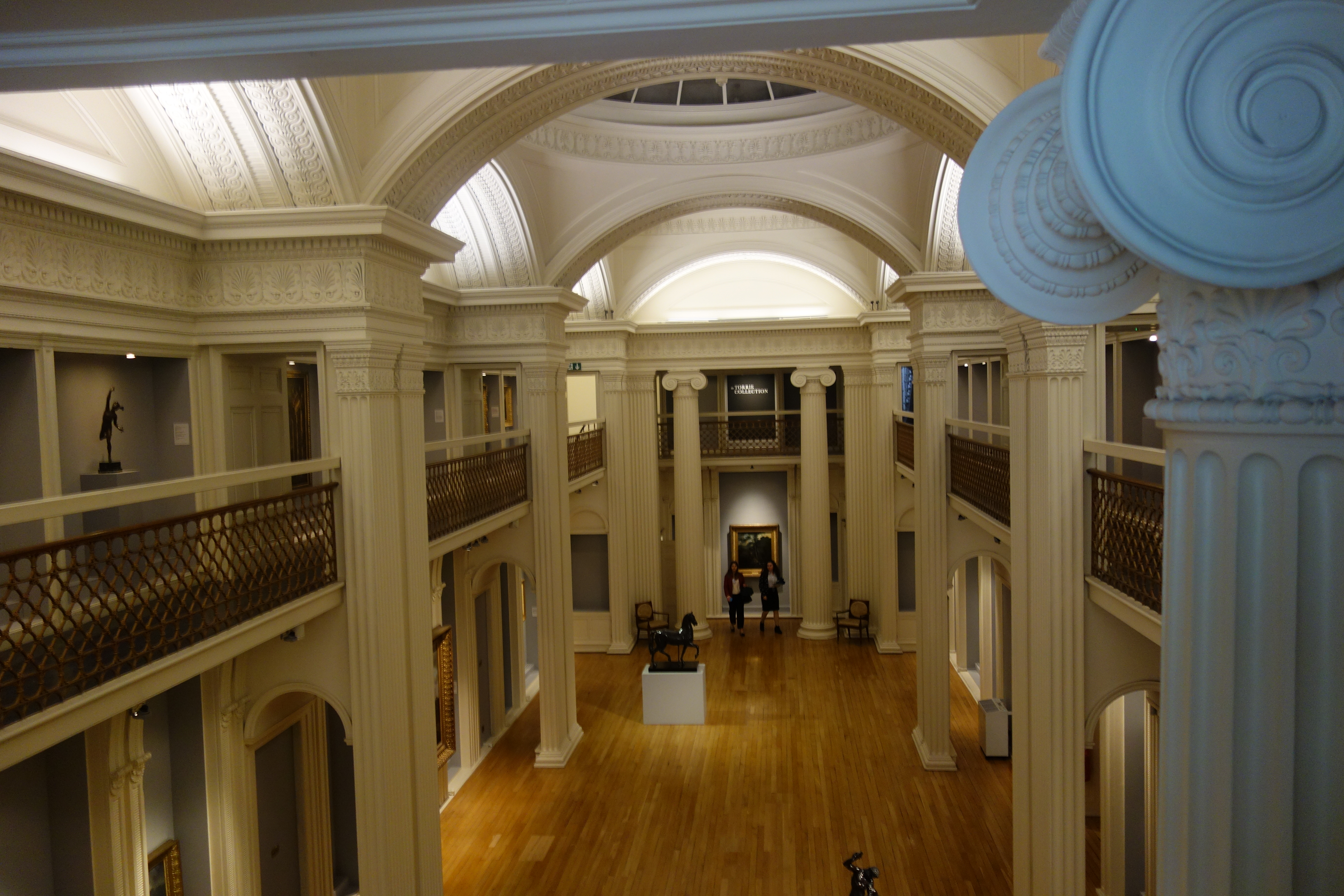
Talbot Rice Gallery

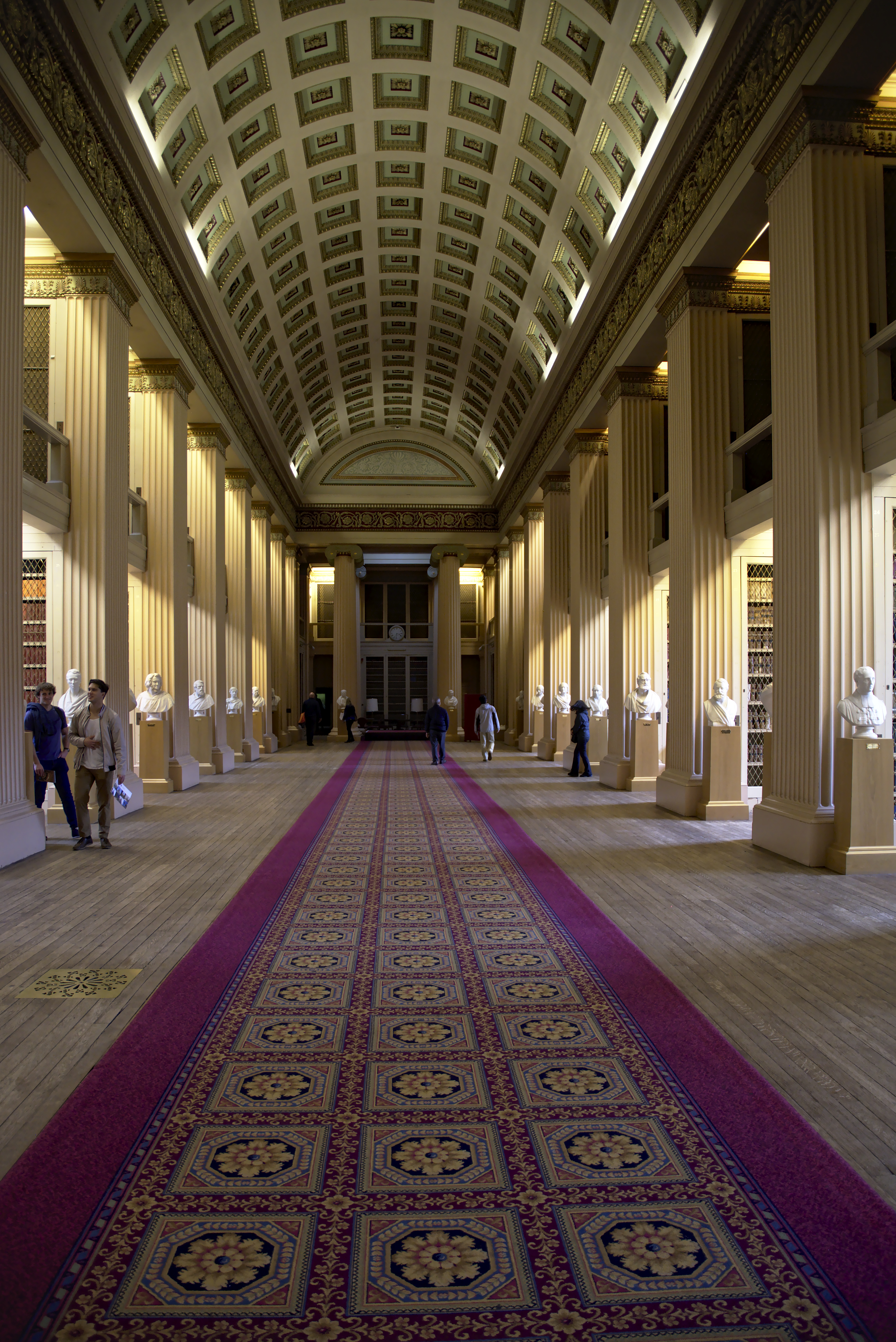
Playfair Library

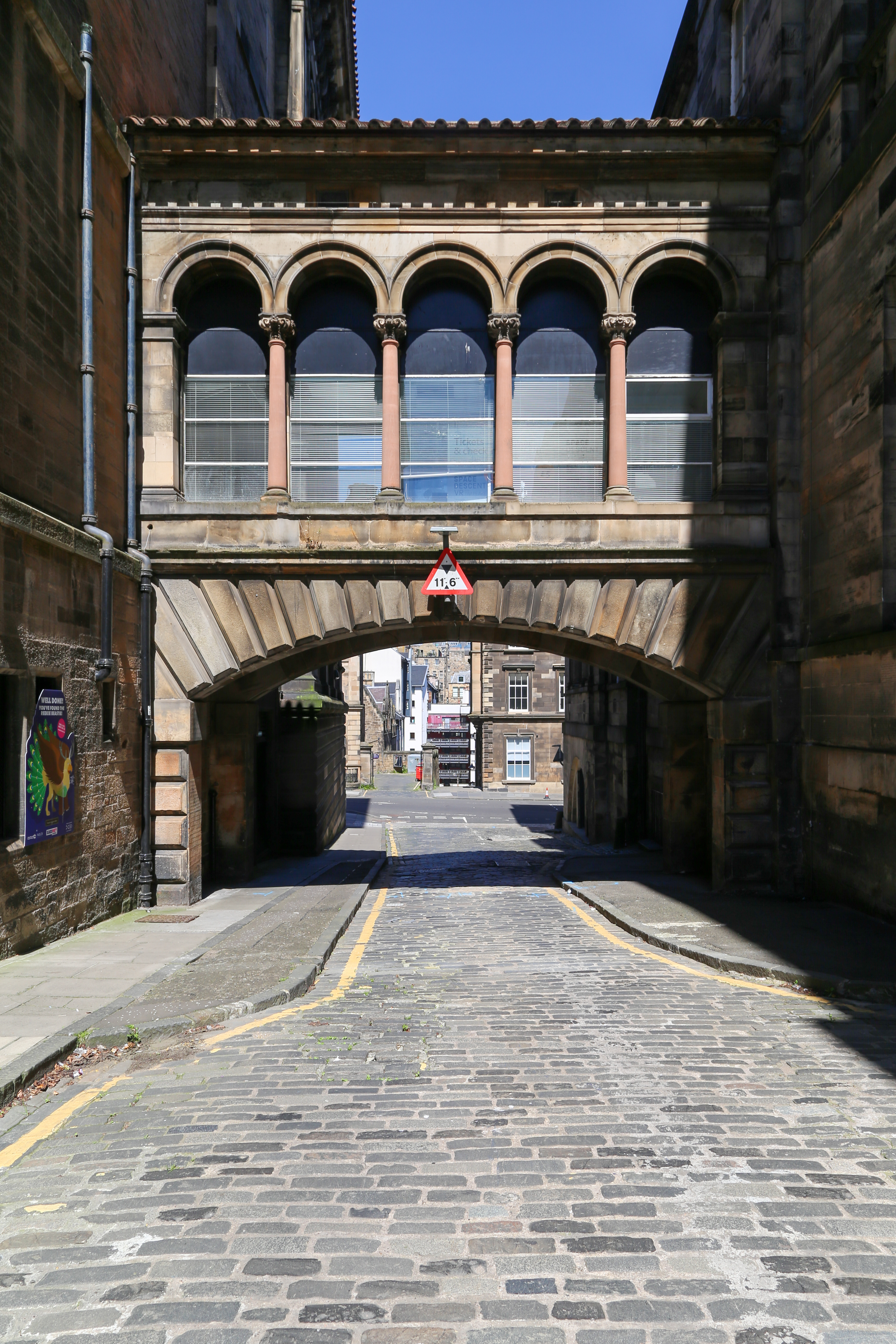
West College St. Bridge, connected to the National Museum of Scotland

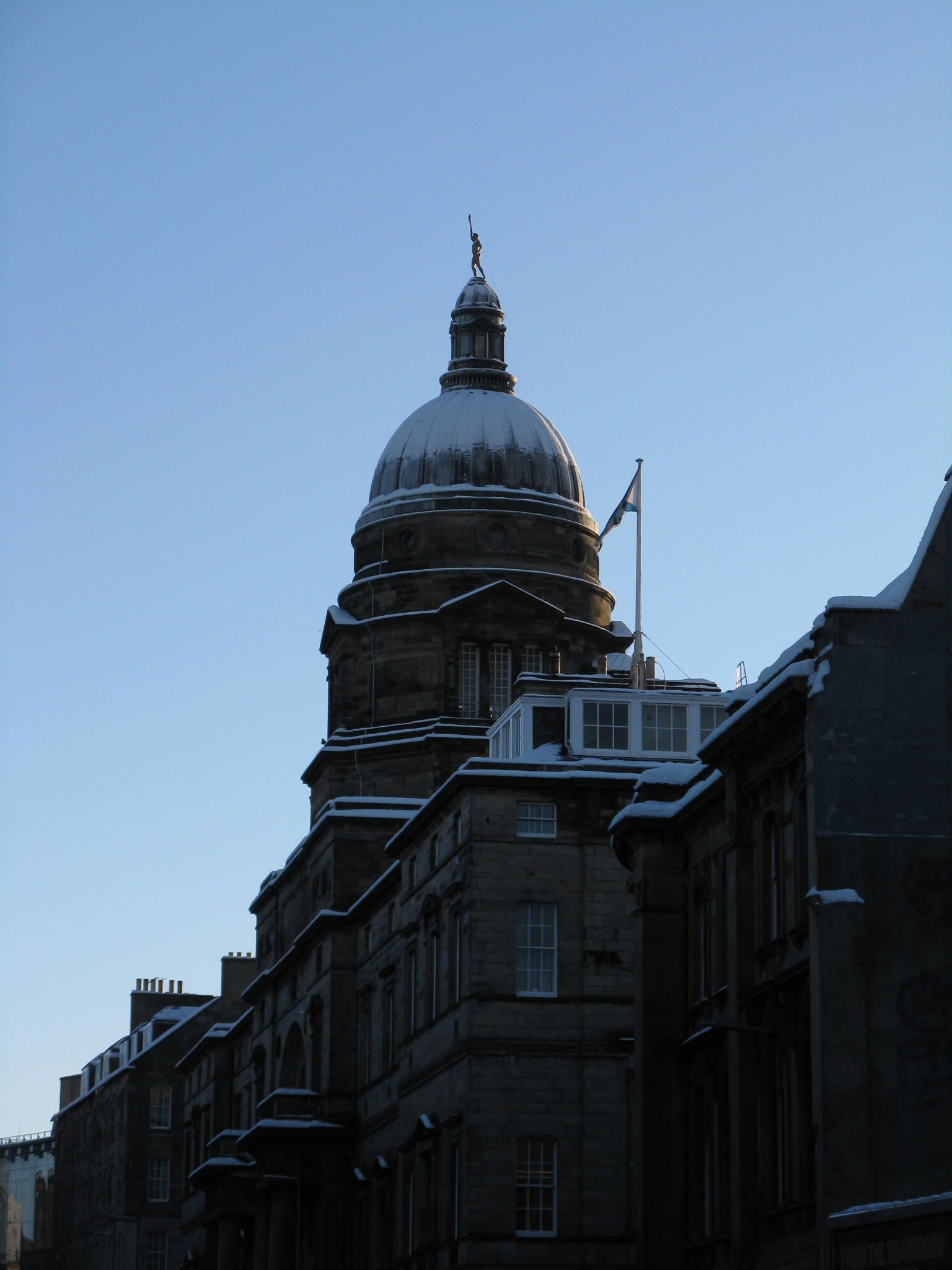
The dome during Winter

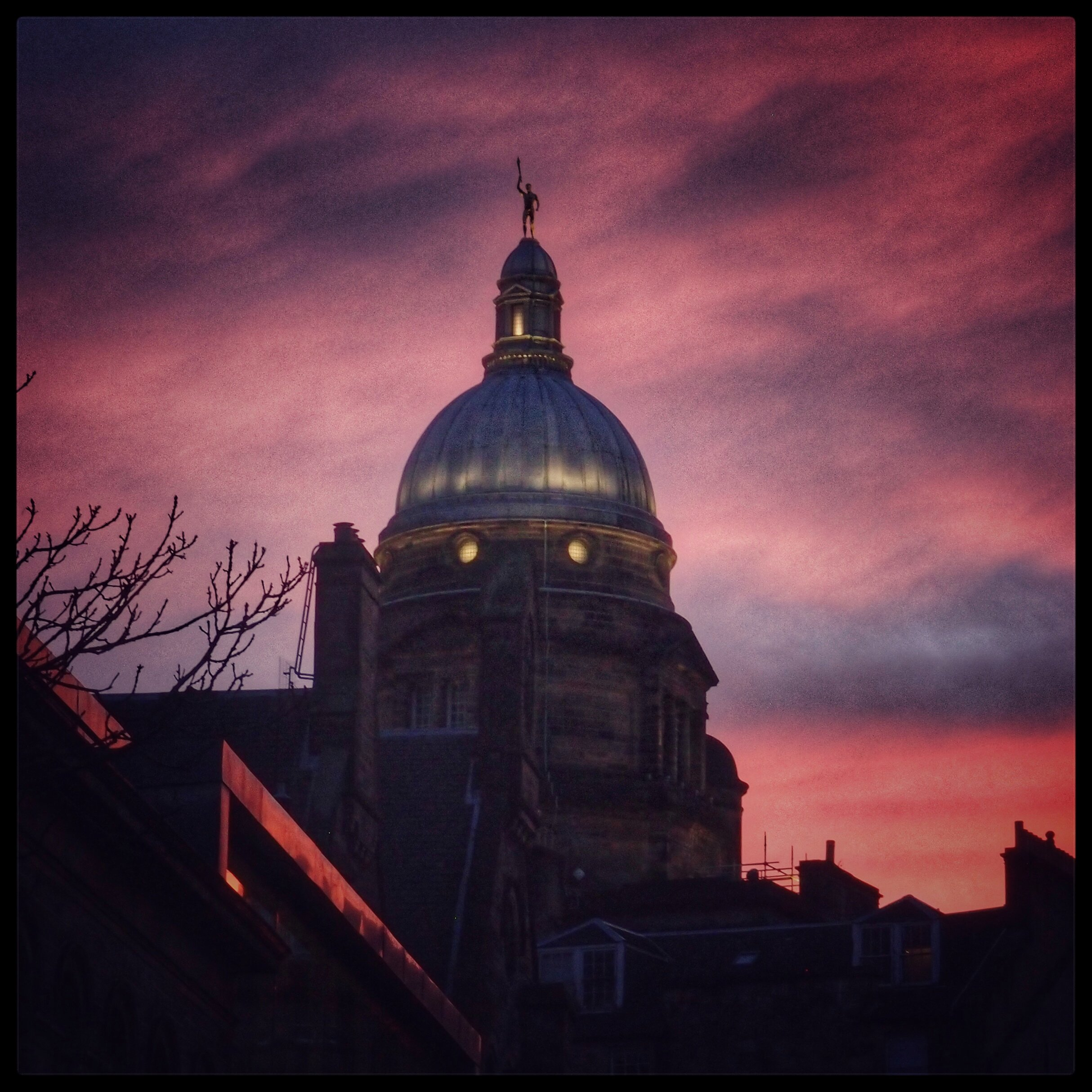
View of the dome during sunset

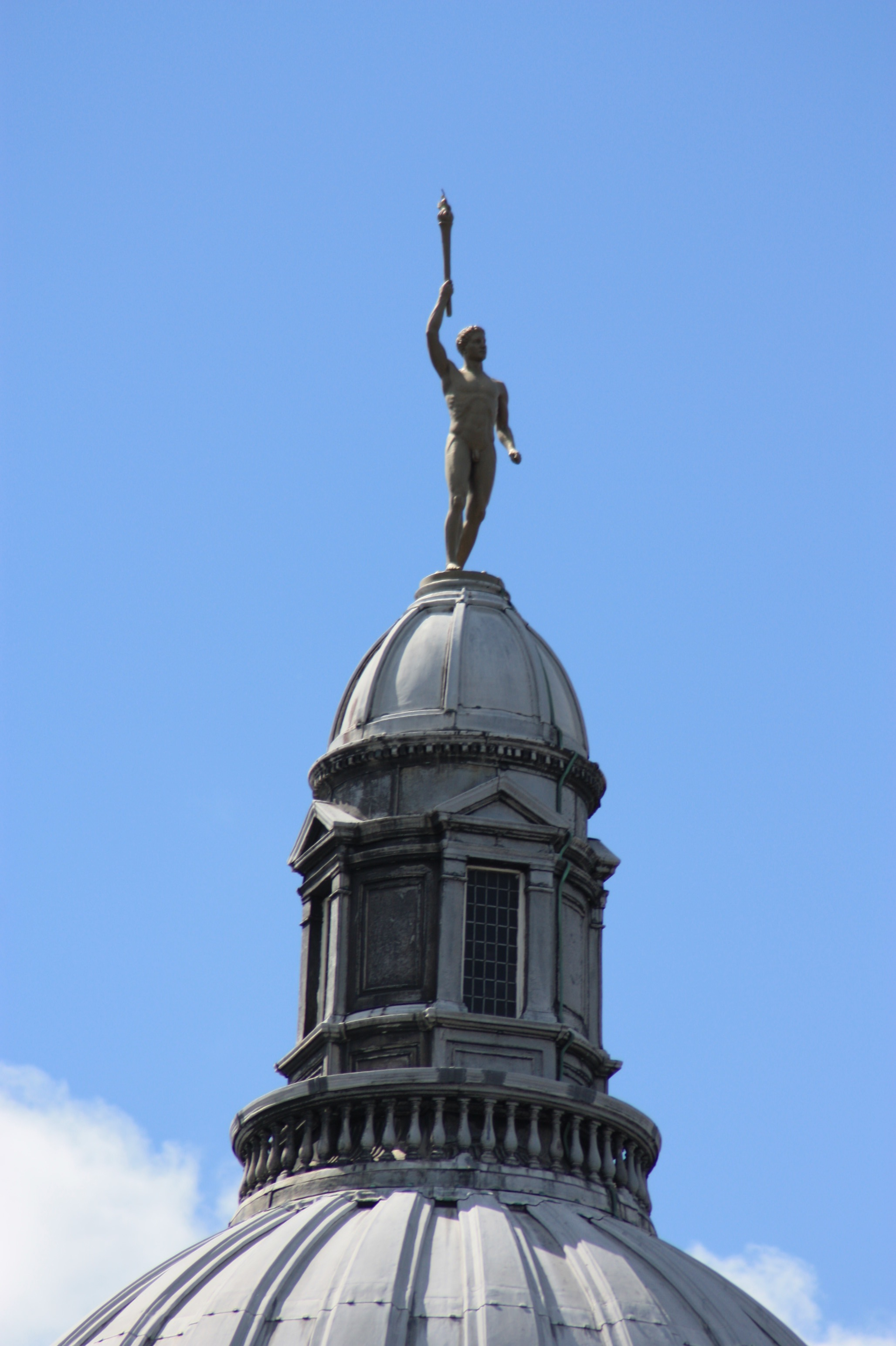
Figure of Youth on the dome of Old College, by John Hutchison
