= Norrie Rowan =

Scotland international rugby union player

- Born: Norman Arthur Rowan; 17 September 1951 (age 75) Edinburgh, Scotland

Rugby union career
- Position: Prop
Amateur team(s)
Years	Team	Apps	(Points)
- Forrester
–	Boroughmuir		
Provincial / State sides
Years	Team	Apps	(Points)
- Edinburgh District
International career
Years	Team	Apps	(Points)
1978-80	Scotland 'B'	3	(0)
1980-88	Scotland	13	(0)

Norman "Norrie" Rowan (born 17 September 1951) is a former Scotland international rugby union player.

== Rugby Union career ==
=== Amateur career ===
He played for Forrester and later Boroughmuir.

=== Provincial career ===
He played for Edinburgh District.

=== International career ===
He had 3 caps for Scotland 'B', the first against France 'B' on 19 March 1978.

He received thirteen caps playing as prop forward for the national team.

He was nominated for Rugby World's "Unsung Hero" award in 1989 – he was the only Scot to be given an award in that year, after playing in all Five Nations matches that year.

== Business and political career ==
As a businessman he has run a number of pubs and bars in Edinburgh, including the Tron Tavern in the Old Town, where it was traditional for the Scotland team to entertain visiting rugby players after international games.

In 1996, he was fined £250 after threatening to kill a lawyer, after a business deal collapsed. The QC at Edinburgh Sheriff Court stated that: "It won't do, however angry you were about your own personal affairs... this behaviour will not be tolerated."

Rowan stood for the Scottish Parliament elections in 1999. He is currently semi retired.

In 2019 he was behind a controversial campaign opposed to the creation of a new homeless centre in Edinburgh city. The campaign distributed posters using the slogan "If you want a junkie for a neighbour vote Labour", echoing a controversial Conservative slogan from the Smethwick 1964 general election. The poster said the council was 'bringing 1100 junkies to a street near you'.

In 2022 he maintained his anger over homeless people. He stated that 'These homeless people don't belong in the Old Town'. He also attacked the Spaces For People measures; and attacked the council decision to ban strip clubs in the area. He ran for Edinburgh Council in May 2022, in the City Centre ward. He received 84 votes, less than 1% of the votes cast.

== Edinburgh Vaults ==
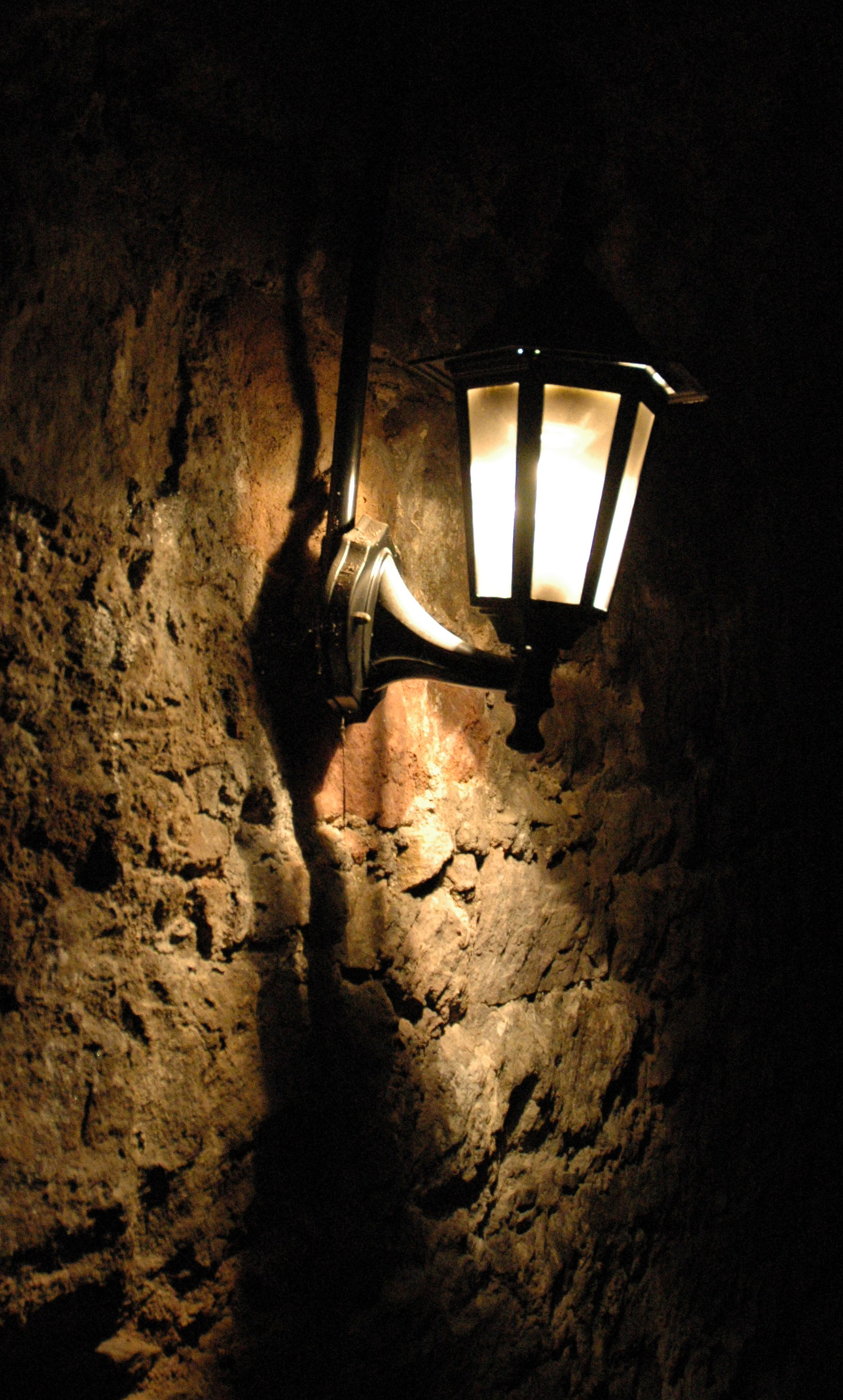
Inside the Edinburgh Vaults, partly excavated by Norrie Rowan.

Rowan helped excavate the Edinburgh Vaults, after he found a tunnel leading to them in the 1980s. From this tunnel he helped Romanian rugby player Cristian Raducanu escape the Romanian secret police and seek political asylum weeks before the Romanian uprising of 1989.
