= Cristian Raducanu =

Romanian rugby union player (born 1967)

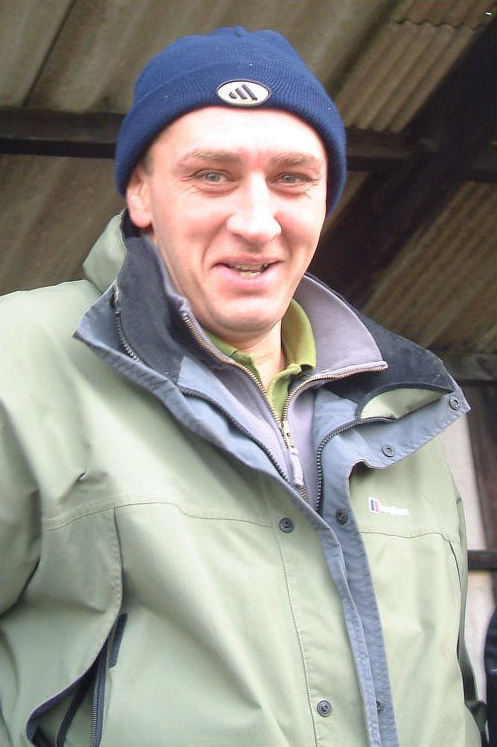
- Romanian rugby union international Cristian Raducanu spectating at Sedgley Park RUFC, Manchester, while injured during the 2004–2005 season.
- Born: 2 September 1967 (age 59)
- Height: 6 ft 6 in (1.98 m)
- Weight: 233 lb (106 kg; 16 st 9 lb)

Rugby union career
- Position: Lock
International career
Years	Team	Apps	(Points)
1985–1989	Romania	11	

Cristian Raducanu (born Cristian Răducanu, names now also spelled Christian and Radacanu; born 2 September 1967) is a retired international rugby union player who represented Romania before his defection to the United Kingdom in 1989. He started seven international matches for the Romanian national team as well as being a replacement in four other of their internationals. Raducanu was described by Bill McLaren as a "world-class lineout exponent".

== Early life and Romanian career ==
Cristian Raducanu was born on 2 October 1967 in Bucharest, Romania. He grew to be 1.98 metres (6 ft 6 in) tall, weighing 106 kilograms (234 lb), and played rugby as a lock and Number 8. He played club rugby for Dynamo Bucharest and at his international debut for Romania on 7 December 1985 against Italy at L'Aquila, he became the youngest player ever to have played for the country. He was one of the youngest players to have started a match in the Rugby World Cup, competing at Number 8 against Zimbabwe at the age of 19 years 233 days in Auckland on 23 May 1987. (Note: Craig D. Brown, the Zimbabwean fly-half in that match, was the youngest player to start a match in the entire tournament, aged 19 years 111 days.) As of 2011, he still held the record as the youngest Number 8 to have started a Rugby World Cup match. His last international was in the 32-0 defeat to Scotland at Murrayfield Stadium, Edinburgh on 9 December 1989, at the tail-end of a brief shining for Romanian rugby. He later said that

Those were times long gone. Before the communist regime collapsed, big conglomerates backed the team, so they would look good in the eyes of the world. But when the gates opened, all the best players, all the cream, went elsewhere, mainly to France. There was no youth set-up, either.

== Defection ==
Raducanu defected from Romania at the age of 22 while in Edinburgh, on the same day he played his last international. He says that he made a "spur-of-the-moment" decision, asking a passing policeman for political asylum after dodging team security to walk out of a post-match banquet. The policeman thought that he was drunk. His move came soon after that of his compatriot Nadia Comăneci, and less than a fortnight before the overthrow of Nicolae Ceaușescu in his home country. He soon obtained his release from the Romanian Rugby Federation (RRF), allowing him to play in competitions organised by the Scottish Rugby Union. RRF officials also announced around that time that they would not object to him playing again for his country, while Raducanu had lined up an opportunity to play for the Scottish Boroughmuir club.

Later accounts of Raducanu's defection suggested a more sensational sequence of events, for which the Glasgow Herald journalist Alasdair Reid provided an analogy

If John Le Carré had tried to write an Ealing comedy script he would have struggled to come up with a combination of intrigue and slapstick as compelling.

According to these accounts, Raducanu's father was possibly a high-ranking member of the Romanian military who was aware of the imminent revolution and concerned about his son's safety in any turmoil that might result. He advised his son, then employed as a fire-fighter, to take advantage of the trip to Scotland. The accounts claim that British security services were aware of this plan. Rather than leaving the party at the banquet, the accounts say that the players of both countries had moved from there to the Tron Tavern, a nearby bar that was run by Norrie Rowan, himself then a Scottish international and Boroughmuir player. This was a customary change of venue and it was from the bar that Raducanu sought to evade members of the Securitate, who were guarding the entrances and exits. The bar was connected to the Edinburgh Vaults and with Rowan's assistance Raducanu was able to surface on the streets several hundred yards away from the premises and then find a policeman. Some of Raducanu's fellow players certainly did die during the revolution, including Florica Murariu and Radu Durbac.

== Career in Britain ==
Advised by the Refugee Council, Raducanu initially kept a low profile in Scotland and was upset by reports that he had abandoned his wife and baby daughter in Romania, making it known that he was telephoning them daily. Rowan gave him work on a construction site, and he made his Boroughmuir debut on 20 January 1990, although it was unclear at that point whether he intended to stay in Scotland on a permanent basis. His wife and daughter were able to escape Romania soon after.

Raducanu later played rugby in England. He made four 1st XV appearances for Leeds in the 1998-1999 season and also played for Bradford & Bingley and Sale before moving to Sedgley Park in Manchester, where he was captain and held a club record, scoring tries in six consecutive matches. He also played in the County Championship-winning Yorkshire team.

He wound down his career from around the age of 35 after having had at least 14 operations on a troublesome knee, although he was still playing occasionally for Sedgley's 1st XV and for their 2nd XV as a 40-year-old in 2007. The Scotsman described him in 2002 as being "known universally as one of the most amiable and popular men in the sport".

== Later life ==
Since 1996, Raducanu has owned a business importing, manufacturing and selling solid-wood furniture. That business involves dealings with his homeland and, in 2007, he worked with Whitgift School and the Romanian Embassy in London to arrange a scholarship for a promising young rugby player from his home country.
