= Edinburgh Vaults =

Chambers under the South Bridge

Coordinates: 55°56′58″N 3°11′14″W

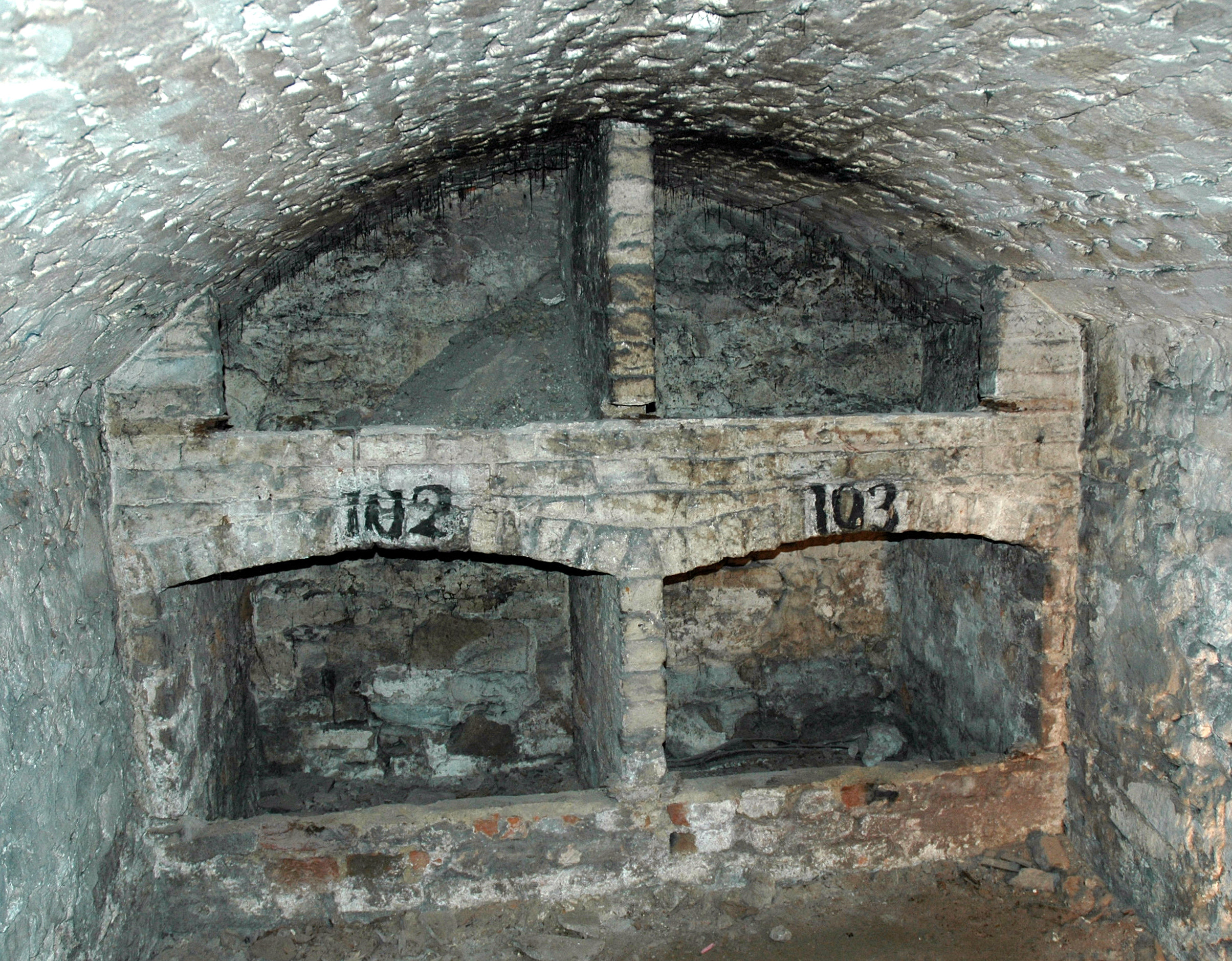
One of the vaults used as storage space

The Edinburgh Vaults or South Bridge Vaults are a series of chambers formed in the nineteen arches of the South Bridge in Edinburgh, Scotland. South Bridge was part of the South Bridge Act 1785 and was completed in 1788. For around 30 years, the vaults were used to house taverns, workshops for cobblers and other tradesmen, as well as storage space for said merchants. In later years, the vaults were a hotspot for the homeless and for criminal activity such as illegal gambling taverns, illegal whisky distillery and, according to rumour, bodysnatchers stored corpses there overnight. There is however no proof that the serial killers Burke and Hare ever used the vaults.

As the conditions in the vaults deteriorated, mainly because of damp and poor air quality, the businesses left in the 1820s and the very poorest of Edinburgh's citizens moved in, though by around 1860, even they are believed to have left too. That people had lived there was only discovered in 1985 during an excavation, when middens were found containing toys, medicine bottles, plates, and other signs of human habitation.

== Background ==
Edinburgh was a growing community in the late 18th century and two bridges were built to facilitate the expansion, North Bridge and South Bridge, known locally as 'The Bridges'. The South Bridge, built to span the Cowgate gorge between High Street and the growing University of Edinburgh on the Southside, was first proposed in 1775, although work did not begin until August 1785.

Edinburgh's South Bridge was Edinburgh's first purpose-built shopping street, and as such as much space as possible was utilized. The bridge itself is a nineteen arch viaduct, although only one arch is visible today, the 'Cowgate arch.' The remaining eighteen arches were enclosed behind tenement buildings built to allow the area to serve as a commercial district. The hidden arches of the bridge were then given extra floors to allow their use for industry. In total, there are approximately 120 rooms or 'vaults' beneath the surface of the South Bridge, ranging in size from two metres squared to forty metres squared.

== History ==
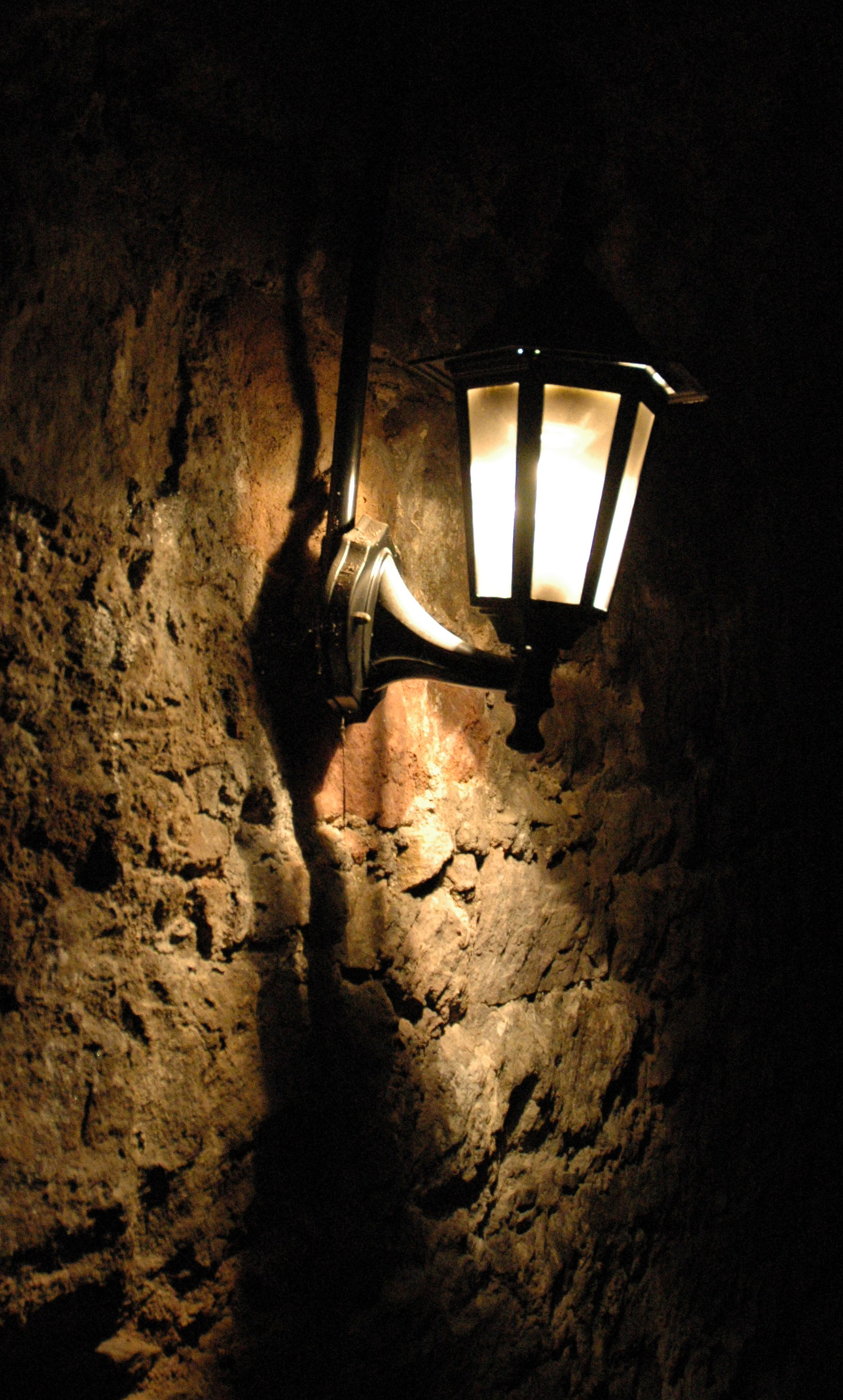
Inside the vaults

The vault rooms, used as storage space and workshops for the South Bridge businesses, operated as intended for a relatively short space of time. Construction of the bridge had been rushed and the surface was never sealed against water. The vaults began to flood. Abandonment of the vaults began as early as 1795. With the vaults being gradually abandoned by the businesses on the bridge, the empty rooms were adopted and adapted by new users. As the Industrial Revolution took hold of Britain, the Cowgate area had developed into Edinburgh's slum. The vaults also served as additional slum housing for the city's poor. Living conditions were appalling. The rooms were cramped, dark and damp. There was no sunlight, poorly circulated air, no running water, and no sanitation. Many rooms housed families of more than ten people. Crimes, including robbery and murder, soon plagued the Vaults. The vaults were lighted with fish oil lamps, which combined with the stench of stale waste and chamber pots made the area barely habitable. There is no evidence that Burke and Hare, the infamous serial killers who sold corpses to medical schools, used the vaults for their body snatching activities.

On Saturday 1 July 1815, the Edinburgh Evening Courant reported that:

On the 24th inst. Mr McKenzie, supervisor, accompanied by Mess. Gorie and McNaugton, officers, discovered a private distillery, of considerable extent, under the arch of the South Bridge, which has been working these 18 months past, to the great injury of the revenue. The particulars of this seizure are worthy of notice, from the great pains which had been taken to prevent disclosure. The original door to the place where the operations were going forward had been carefully built up and plastered over, so as to prevent any appearance of an entrance. Behind a grate in the fireplace of a bed-room, an opening had been made, and fitted with an iron door and lock, exactly fitting the grate, which could only be seen by being removed; and this passage led to the flat above by a trap-door and ladder, where the still was working. This place again was in one of the deaf arches, immediately adjoining the middle arch of the bridge, (now The Caves venue), and the person had found means to convey a pipe from one of the town’s branches, which gave a plentiful supply of water. A soil pipe was also got at, and a hole broke through into a neighbouring vent to carry off the smoke. Besides the still, a considerable quantity of wash, and some low wines, were found in the premises; also many casks, mash ton, large tubs, etc.

It is not known when the vaults complex was closed down, with some suggesting as early as c. 1835 and others as late as c. 1875. Written records regarding the vaults during their slum use are virtually non-existent.

The vaults were rediscovered by former Scottish rugby internationalist, Norrie Rowan, after he found a tunnel leading to them in the 1980s. From this tunnel he helped Romanian rugby player Cristian Raducanu escape the Romanian secret police and seek political asylum weeks before the Romanian Revolution of 1989.

The vaults were excavated by Norrie Rowan and his son Norman Rowan in the 1990s. Hundreds of tonnes of rubble were removed by hand and several interesting artifacts were discovered including thousands of oyster shells.

== Current uses of the Edinburgh Vaults ==
The vaults on the north side of the Cowgate arch form a series of tunnels and vaults and are mainly used for ghost tours. The vaults on the south side of the Cowgate arch form a venue called The Caves and The Rowantree, which hosts private events, weddings, private dining, live music and the occasional club night. There are areas within The Caves that are the building remains of what was Adam Square, that were demolished to make way for the erection of the South Bridge. The original terracotta floor tiles, a hearth stone, and what remains of a fireplace, were found in one of the rooms within The Caves whilst it was being excavated. In another room, within The Caves, a well was found.

During the Edinburgh Festival Fringe in August, the vaults that make up The Caves and The Rowantree, along with several normally unused vaults, are transformed into a major festival venue hosting over 60 different shows a day.

== Paranormal reports ==
The television show Ghost Adventures investigated the vaults and claimed to have numerous encounters with spirits there.

In 2003, the television show Most Haunted also investigated the vaults, claiming spirits were there. Season 3, Episode 3. Most Haunted returned to the vaults for their Most Haunted Live for Halloween 2006.

In 2009, a BBC TV production team filming a one-off TV special featuring Joe Swash recorded unexplained voices in the vaults during an overnight sleepover by Swash. Swash was the only person in the vaults and did not hear the voices himself at the time of recording, despite the sounds being audible on his own microphone. The voices continued to be heard on the recording for some 20 minutes before abruptly ceasing after what appears to be the sound of children yelling. BBC sound engineers initially thought the sounds may be explained by voices drifting into the tunnels from nightclubs nearby, but the actual source was not identified. The recordings were broadcast as part of the finished program Joe Swash Believes in Ghosts on BBC Three in January 2010.

So far, there are no possible causes, explanations, or reliable sources confirming that these incidents were indeed supernatural.

== In popular culture ==
In August 2023, a play about the Vaults premiered at the Edinburgh Fringe Festival. "Brief Candle", written by Edinburgh-based playwright David R. Ford, tells the story of the Great Fire of Edinburgh from the point of view of a teenage resident of the Vaults.

- In Gary Mill's novel 'Blackfriar', much of the action takes place in the Edinburgh Vaults.
- In Maggie Craig's novel 'One Sweet Moment', the protagonist Catriona Dunbar and her family live in the vaults inside the South Bridge.
