= Forrester RFC =

Scottish Rugby union football club

(Scotland) Forrester
- Full name: Forrester Rugby Football Club
- Union: Scottish Rugby Union
- Founded: 1964
- Location: Edinburgh, Scotland
- Ground: Broomhouse
- League: East Division 2
- 2024–25: East Division 1, 8th of 8 (relegated)
Team kit

Official website
- www.forrester-rfc.co.uk/default.aspx

Forrester RFC is a rugby union football club in the Scottish Rugby Union, located at South Gyle Access in Edinburgh. They play in the East Division 2, one of three Scottish Regional Leagues operated by the Scottish Rugby Union.

== History ==
Forrester Former Pupils Rugby Football Club and Sports Association was founded in 1964 by ex-pupils of Forrester High School.

Previously, the majority of school rugby players joined Corstorphine Rugby Club because there were no other choices. Fred Langstaff (English Teacher) and Peter Blyth (English Teacher) decided that there were enough good former pupils to start an FP club.

Drew Elliott and his younger brother Kenny Elliott were the first to be asked to join, along with a few other talented rugby players.

The first few years saw Forrester FP playing the Edinburgh fringe rugby teams, who wanted nothing more than to enjoy rugby.

In 1971, Forrester made the semi-finals of the Edinburgh Knockout competition at Murrayfield, where they were defeated by The Bruce Hay-led Liberton.

Most of the team's after-training tea drinking occurred in The Oak in Corstorphine, until the maître decided that rugby players were no better than football players. The next few years saw Forrester FP Rugby Club in The Dorlin Hotel, St. John's Road, Edinburgh (no longer operating).

The club has participated in the Edinburgh and District League and has found success in a number of Rugby Sevens tournaments including the now-defunct Edinburgh and District trophy, in 1976.

The former clubhouse, situated in the grounds of Forrester High School, was opened in September 1977. In 1987, the existing structure was extended to include changing rooms and showers in addition to other facilities, including a small bar.

Forrester players who went on to achieve international honours include Norrie Rowan and Robert Cunningham (Scottish rugby) and Iain McLeod (Queensland Triathlon Champion 2001).

Having been pipped at the post for three successive years, the club finally won the Edinburgh District League in 1986, gaining promotion to Division 6 of the National League in 1990. After reorganisation, they found themselves in the Division 5 (East) Regional League at the start of season 1999–00. They finished runners-up to Irvine that year, but finally won promotion to Division 4 by beating Hawick YM 13–12 in the final game of 2000/2001 season.

The club's committee were instrumental in setting up the River Series Cup (later the Alloa Series Trophy) in association with Boroughmuir RFC, which for ten years provided Cup competition in Scotland, and provided the springboard for the SRU Tennents Cup competition and ultimately the BT Cellnet Cup. It was perhaps fitting that in the last year of this competition, the Castlemaine XXXX cup was won by Forrester in the gala event.

The club now stands at a crossroads, with a massive Youth development programme and ambitious plans for the development of facilities to nurture talent and enhance the playing standards throughout the area. Although never a ‘closed’ club, ‘Former pupils’ was dropped from the club title at the end of the 2000/01 season.

In 2020, Forrester's Sean Findlay, made the headlines for playing senior club rugby in Scotland for 6 different decades; having started with Stobswell in the 1970s, before joining Forrester in the 1980s where he remained.

== Now ==
A new clubhouse was built under the PPP (Public-Private Partnership) as part of the redevelopment of the area. St Augustine's and Forrester High moved to a shared campus in January 2010, with the new school building situated on the former football pitches and site of the old clubhouse.

On Sunday 19 August 2012, founders, members, families, coaches, players and many more came together to celebrate the opening of the new rugby pitch at Forrester Rugby Club.

== Sevens ==
The club runs the Forrester Sevens tournament.

== Club Presidents ==
- 1965-1974 F. Langstaff
- 1974-1976 A. Elliott
- 1976-1978 A. Jenkins
- 1978-1980 J. Nicol
- 1980-1982 K. Elliott
- 1982-1986 J. Connor
- 1986-1991 J. Robertson
- 1991-2002 T. Stevendale
- 2002-2006 S. Kilpatrick
- 2006-2010 C. Lewis
- 2010-2015 D. Panther
- 2015-2018 E. McComiskie
- 2018-2020 G. Smith
- 2020- Mrs P. Inglis

== Club Captains ==
Season	Captain	Season	Captain	Season	Captain
1965-1966	A. Elliott	1982-1984	T. Stevendale	1997-1998	G. McLoughlin
1966-1969	K. Elliott	1984-1985	G. Marshall	1998-1999	W. Whitelaw
1969-1970	K. Hepburn	1985-1986	K. Hamilton	1999-2000	C. Lewis
1970-1972	S. Fowler	1986-1987	G. Marshall	2000-2001	I. Beveridge
1972-1975	K. Elliott	1987-1989	K. Hamilton	2001-2003	A. Hamilton
1975-1976	A. MacEwan	1989-1990	S. Elliott	2003-2006	C. Bradford
1976-1977	B. Cockburn	1990-1992	W. Whitelaw	2006-2008	S. Roseburgh
1977-1978	A. Hogg	1992-1993	A. Cleland	2008-2009	C. Panther
1978-1979	K. Elliott	1993-1994	C. Lewis	2009-2010	N. Gunderson
1979-1980	D. Imrie	1994-1995	G. McLoughlin	2010-2011	S. Fulton
1980-1981	A. Bald	1995-1996	B. Duffie	2011-2012	P. Bree
1981-1982	C. Macrae	1996-1997	J. Bertram	2012-	E. McComiskie

== Notable players ==
- Norrie Rowan
- Sam Hidalgo-Clyne
- Robert Cunningham
- Iain McLeod
