= South Bridge, Edinburgh =

Bridge and street in Edinburgh, Scotland

South Bridge
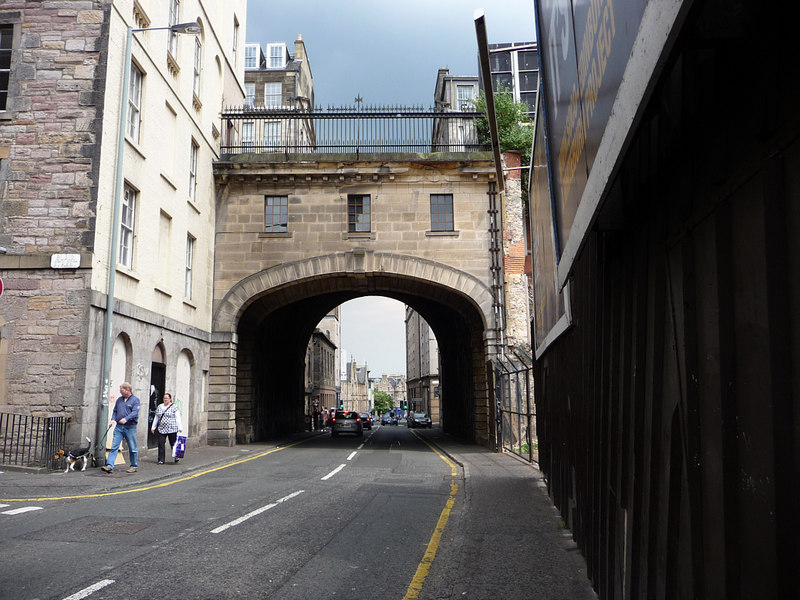
- Exposed bridge arch
- Coordinates: 55.94874°N 3.18683°W
- OS grid reference: NT 25980 73492
- Locale: Edinburgh

Characteristics
- Material: Stone

Listed Building – Category B
- Official name: South Bridge, Including Railings
- Designated: 13 December 1970
- Reference no.: LB27950

Location
- Interactive map of South Bridge

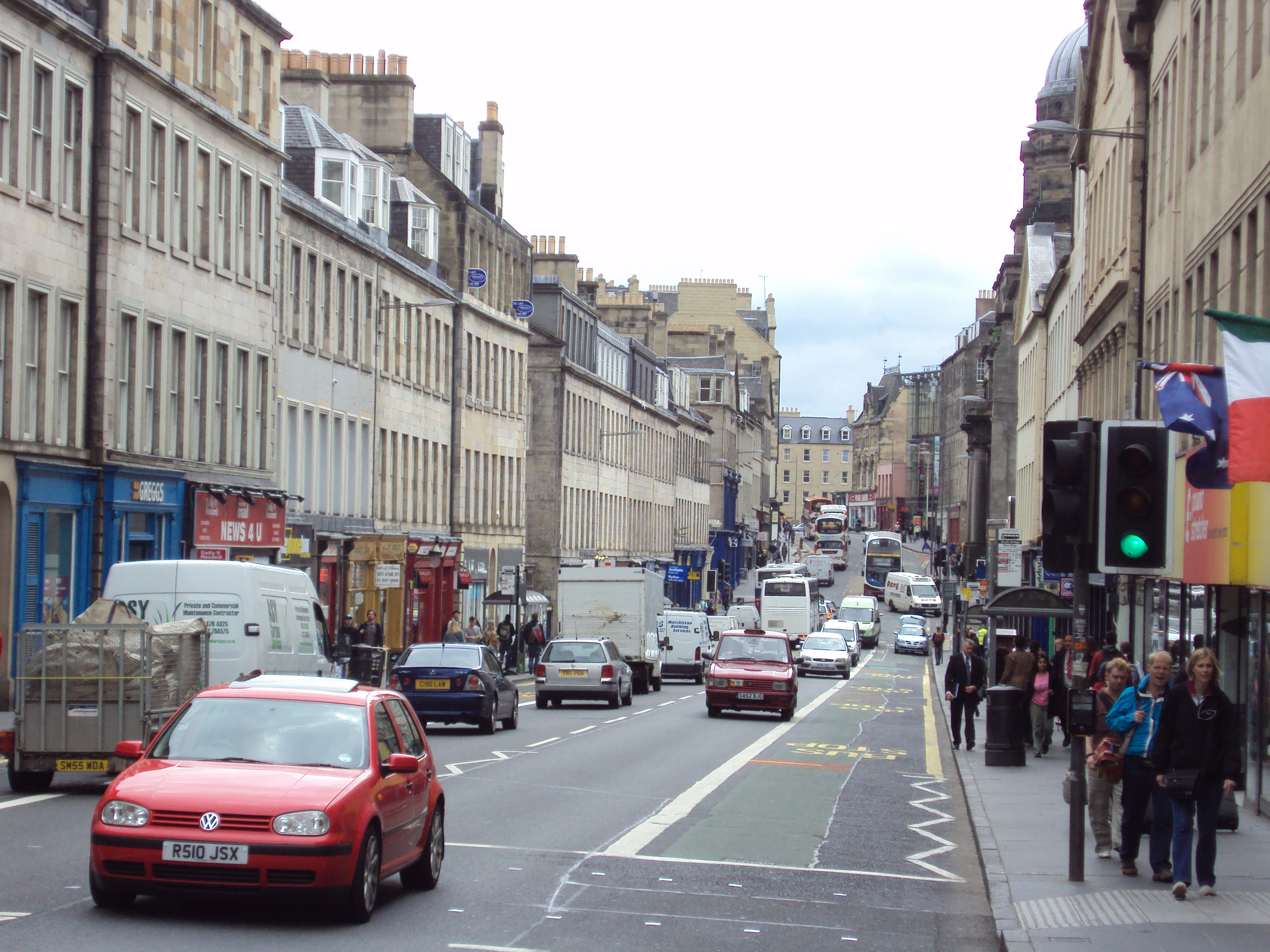
South Bridge

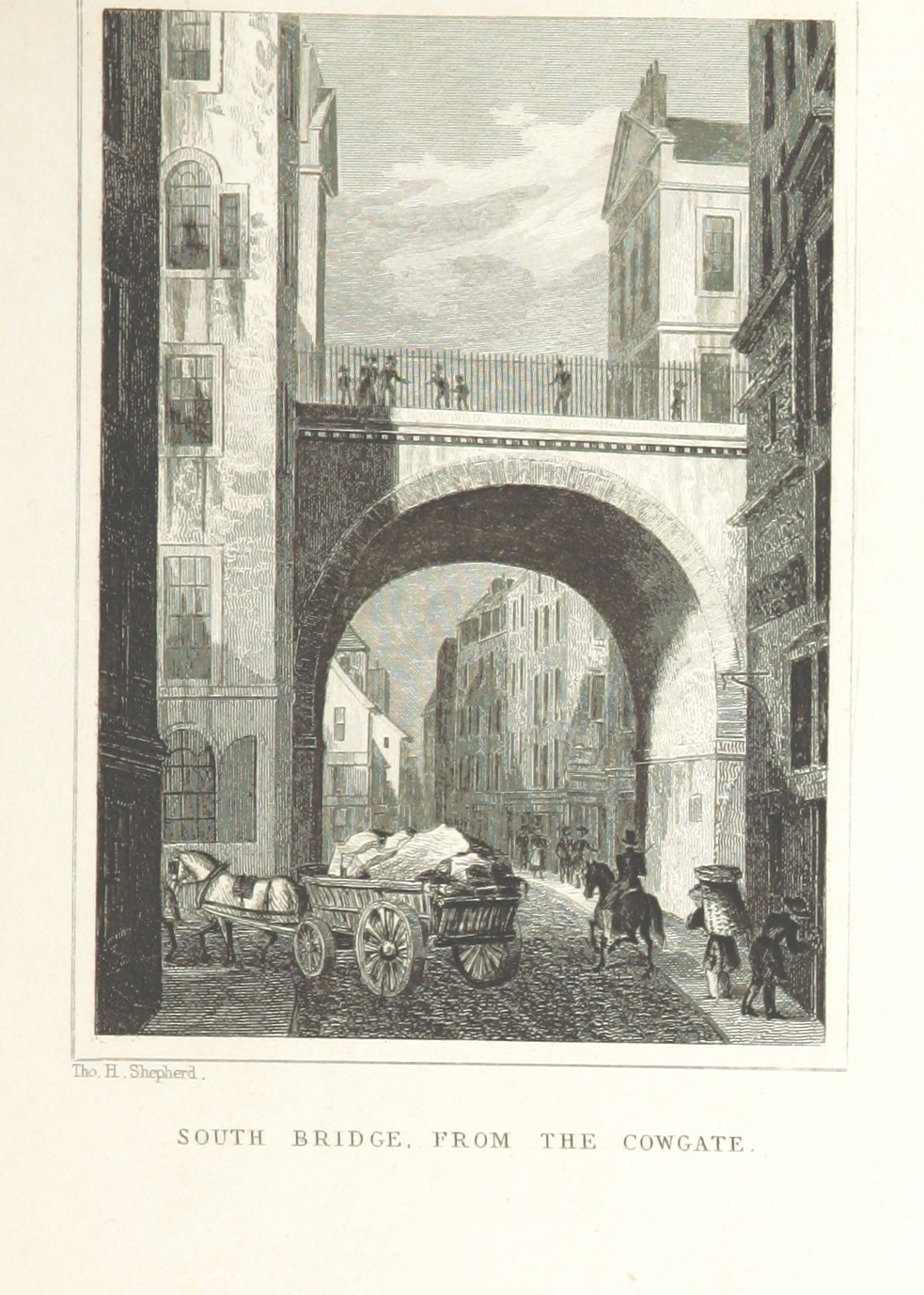
The largest arch of the bridge, seen from the Cowgate.

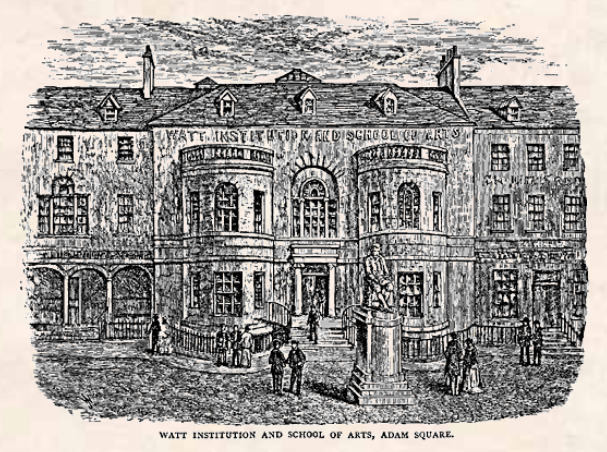
Adam Square in Edinburgh

South Bridge is a road bridge and street in the Old Town of Edinburgh, Scotland, between the High Street, where it meets the North Bridge, to Nicolson Street at the south. It forms a continuous roadway over the steep valley scoured parallel to the High Street when the crag and tail landscape of the city was formed. The bridge dips down from the High Street to the Cowgate (the roadway along the bottom of the valley), which runs under the largest arch of the bridge, before climbing back up to its terminus at Nicolson Street.

The concept of the bridge was raised in 1784 by James Hunter Blair in his capacity as Lord Provost of Edinburgh, as a logical southward extension of the pre-existing North Bridge, which connected Edinburgh's Old Town to its New Town. The southward bridge, set on the same alignment, was to improve connection to the southward land, and spanned over the Cowgate. The works necessitated the loss of many buildings including the old Edinburgh Poultry Market.

The bridge was designed by Robert Kay and built by Alexander Laing.

The South Bridge Act 1785 was passed in the House of Commons of the United Kingdom on 21 April 1785 and in 1789 taxes were raised to fund the South Bridge to a plan prepared by Robert Adam. The foundation stone was laid on 1 August 1785 by George Gordon, Lord Haddo in his capacity as Grand Master Mason of Scotland. The incomplete bridge was opened to foot traffic on 19 November 1786 using planks of wood resting on the completed arches.

The bridge was completed in 1788. It is constructed of nineteen arches, but is almost entirely enclosed by buildings on both sides, exposing only the largest arch where the street crosses the Cowgate. Below deck level are many buildings and vaults, the latter are now something of a tourist attraction. Most of the buildings on the deck level have separate entrances (and sometimes entirely separate functions) at the level of the street passing below (the Cowgate) or parallel to the bridge (Niddry Street and Blair Street).

The only older element incorporated into the South Bridge streetscape was Adam Square, which occupied the extreme south-west section and was built around 1770. This section has been twice rebuilt since its demolition around 1870 to build Chambers Street.

In 2002 the "Cowgate Fire" destroyed a section of the original buildings in the south-west quadrant. This section has now been rebuilt as a hotel and supermarket.

The historic structure contains one interior of great significance: Goldsmiths Hall, a relatively intact room linked to the old trade guilds. This attic level space is wholly unseen from the exterior and is also now only accessed via a characterless corridor entered from Blair Street.

Initially, town plans such as John Ainslie's 1804 map showed the street name as "South Bridge Street", by the 1850s the name had been shortened to "South Bridge".

== See also ==
- North Bridge, Edinburgh
- George IV Bridge
- 2002 Cowgate Fire, which destroyed and damaged several South Bridge buildings.
- Edinburgh Vaults
- List of bridges in Scotland
