= South Bridge Act 1785 =

Act of the Parliament of Great Britain

- Act of Parliament
- Parliament of Great Britain
- Long title: An Act for opening an easy and commodious Communication from the High Street of Edinburgh, to the Country Southward; and also from the Lawn Market to the New extended Royalty on the North, and for enabling Trustees to purchase Lands, Houses, and Areas for that Purpose; for widening and enlarging the Streets of the said City, and certain Avenues leading to the same; for rebuilding or improving the University.
- Citation: 25 Geo. 3. c. 28
- Introduced by: Henry Dundas (Lords)
- Territorial extent: Great Britain

Dates
- Royal assent: 13 May 1785
- Commencement: 25 January 1785 (Note: Start of session.)
- Repealed: 14 August 1848
Other legislation
Repealed by	Edinburgh Police Act 1848

Status: Repealed

Text of statute as originally enacted

The South Bridge Act 1785 (25 Geo. 3. c. 28), also known as the Edinburgh (Streets) Act 1785, was an act of the Parliament of Great Britain concerning infrastructure in the city of Edinburgh. Specifically, for the construction of what would become the South Bridge, for rebuilding or improving the University of Edinburgh, for enlarging the public markets, for lighting the said city, for providing an additional supply of water, for extending the royalty of the said city for levying an additional sum of money for statute labour in the middle district of the county of Edinburgh, to complete the Mound and to erect a bridge between the road to Leith and Calton Hill across Calton Street.

== South Bridge Scheme ==
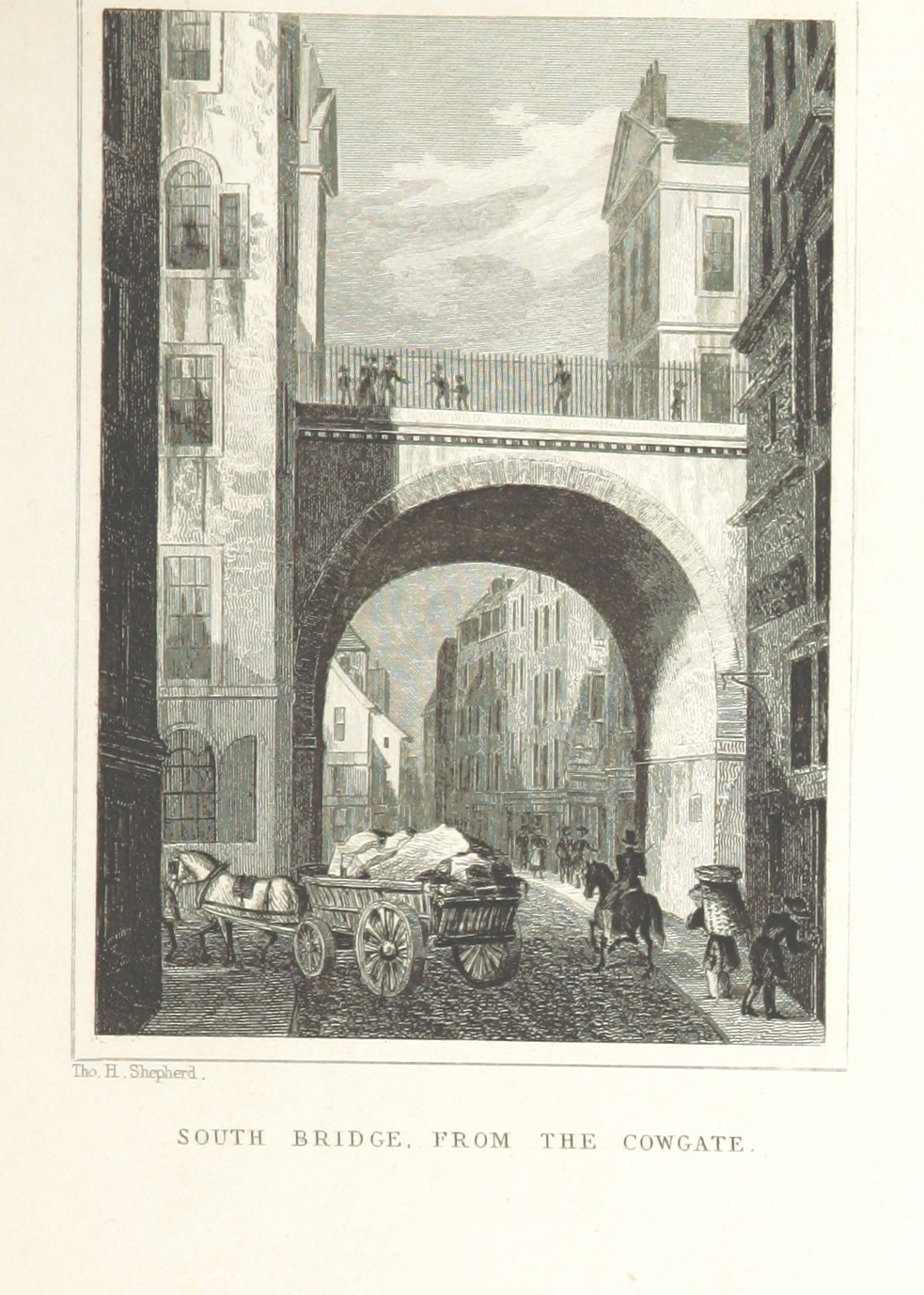
The South Bridge as built, seen from the Cowgate.

The first specific proposal for a South Bridge was produced on 6 September 1775 with the publication of a pamphlet setting out heads of a Bill. The promoters were a Committee of Heritors of the Shire of Edinburgh, including Henry Dundas who acted as Chairman, and the Duke of Buccleuch.

In 1784 the scheme for the South Bridge was revived and with it the hopes of rebuilding the College on the existing site. Andrew Dalzell wrote to a friend in December: "It is now resolved to build a bridge across the Cowgate, passing between the College and the Infirmary. It is thought that when the posteriors of the College are exposed, people will be shamed into building a new College." This startling prospect gave rise to another pamphlet, published in early 1785 by James Gregory, Professor of the Theory of Medicine, in the form of "A letter to the Right Honourable Henry Dundas on the Proposed Improvements in the City of Edinburgh."

== Trustees for the University of Edinburgh and the South Bridge Act 1785 ==
- James Hunter Blair; Lord Provost of Edinburgh
- The Rt Hon Henry Dundas, 1st Viscount Melville
- The Rt Hon Ilay Campbell; Lord Advocate of Scotland
- Sir William Forbes; Baronet of Pitsligo
- Robert Macqueen of Braxfield esq., Senator of the College of Justice
- Archibald McDowal esq.; Merchant and Dean of the Guild of Edinburgh
- John Grieve esq.; Merchant in Edinburgh
- Mr. William Jamieson; Mason and Convener of the Trades of Edinburgh
- John Davidson esq.; Writer to the Signet
- Niel McViccar esq.; Merchant in Edinburgh
- James Brown esq.; Architect
