= Edinburgh Rugby =

Scottish rugby union club, based in Edinburgh

Edinburgh
- Full name: Edinburgh Rugby
- Founded: 1872; 154 years ago
- Location: Edinburgh, Scotland
- Ground: Edinburgh Rugby Stadium (capacity: 7,800)
- CEO: Douglas Struth
- Coach: Sean Everitt
- Captain: Magnus Bradbury
- Most appearances: Allan Jacobsen (286)
- Top scorer: Chris Paterson (783)
- Most tries: Tim Visser (69)
- League: United Rugby Championship
- 2024–25: League: 7th Playoffs: Quarter-final
1st kit	2nd kit

Official website
- edinburghrugby.org
- Current season

Edinburgh Rugby (formerly Edinburgh Reivers and Edinburgh Gunners) is one of the two professional rugby union teams from Scotland. The club competes in the United Rugby Championship, along with the Glasgow Warriors, its oldest rival. Edinburgh plays the majority of its home games at Edinburgh Rugby Stadium. Within the Championship, Edinburgh competes for the URC Scottish Italian shield with Glasgow, Benetton and Zebre Parma, which it has won once, and the 1872 Cup with Glasgow alone, which it has won seven times, the last in 2022. Its best finish in the Championship proper was runner-up in the 2008-09 season.

Outside the Championship, Edinburgh also competes in EPCR competitions; the European Rugby Champions Cup and the EPCR Challenge Cup.

The original Edinburgh District team played the first ever inter-district match against Glasgow District in 1872, winning the match 3–0.

The amateur district team was reconsituted with professionalism, as Edinburgh Rugby, in 1996 to compete in the Heineken Cup. In 2003–04 Edinburgh became the first Scottish team to reach the quarter-finals of that competition. Its best performance coming in the 2011–12 season, when the club reached the semi-final but lost out narrowly to Ulster, 22–19. The quarter-final tie that season against Toulouse attracted a then club-record crowd of 37,881 spectators to Murrayfield.

In the 2014–15 season, Edinburgh became the first Scottish club to reach a major European final, when they met Gloucester Rugby in the European Rugby Challenge Cup showpiece at Twickenham Stoop in London.

As of 2025, the home attendance record stands at 40,063, achieved in a United Rugby Championship / 1872 Cup tie against Glasgow Warriors in 2024.

== History ==
Edinburgh District played in the world's first ever inter-district match, against Glasgow District, in 1872.

For the history of the District prior to professionalism, see:

=== Professional era establishment: 1996 ===
Following the introduction of professional rugby in 1995, the Scottish Rugby Union (SRU) considered that Scottish club sides would not be able to compete against the best teams from France and England. The SRU therefore decided that the four district teams were to be Scotland's vehicle for professional rugby and in 1996 the Edinburgh District team was reformed as Edinburgh Rugby to compete in the Heineken Cup. Because of the SRU's significant debt, partly as a result of the redevelopment of Murrayfield Stadium, further reorganisation soon became necessary and the four professional sides were reduced to two. After two seasons as Edinburgh Rugby, the club was subsequently merged with Border Reivers to form a new team known as Edinburgh Reivers.

For the 1999 and 2000 seasons the Scottish Rugby Union and Welsh Rugby Union joined forces, with the expansion of the Welsh Premier Division to include Edinburgh Reivers and Glasgow Caledonians, under the name Welsh-Scottish League. However, further change was imminent and in 2001 an agreement was made between the Irish Rugby Football Union, Scottish Rugby Union and Welsh Rugby Union to create a new competition which would bring in the four Irish provinces. 2001 saw the first incarnation of the Celtic League. In that inaugural season Edinburgh finished in sixth place.

The following season, to coincide with the re-establishment of the Border Reivers, a Scottish League competition modelled on the Tri-Nations was introduced alongside the Celtic League, however this survived for only a single season, Edinburgh becoming the only champions.

Following the reduction of Scotland's professional structure from four to two sides, a further rebranding took place. The Edinburgh Reivers name was replaced by Edinburgh Rugby, with the Glasgow Caledonians undergoing a similar renaming process, as part of a "major revamp" of the professional structure in Scotland.

In the 2003–04 season the team found some success, when it reached the Final of the inaugural Celtic Cup, beating Cardiff Blues and Connacht en route in the quarter-finals and semi-finals respectively. The team's good run came to an end in the Final, however, with a 21–27 loss to Ulster, at Murrayfield. David Humphreys kicked 17 points in the match to earn the Irish province the trophy

For the 2005–06 season, the Edinburgh team found itself looking for a new coach after the departure of Frank Hadden to coach Scotland. Sean Lineen, then Glasgow Warriors assistant coach, was linked with the post before Todd Blackadder acquired the position for the season after a spell as interim coach. During the same season the team nickname was incorporated into the official name, which became the Edinburgh Gunners. The "Gunners" moniker was dropped on 29 September 2006, after the club had become Scottish rugby's first private franchise during the summer. The team name reverted to Edinburgh Rugby. One reason for the change was that the name The Gunners was already a registered trademark of Arsenal Football Club.

=== Private ownership: 2006–07 ===
==== Scotland's first private franchise: 2006 ====
Logo for the 2006–07 Celtic League season

In 2006, it was announced that from the end of the 2005–06 season, Edinburgh would become a franchise. Finance would come from a private company headed by businessmen Alex and Bob Carruthers. This was thought to be a saving grace for Border Reivers. The team was thought to be the favourite to be folded, after the Scottish Rugby Union warned that funding problems could force it to scrap one of its Celtic League sides. The SRU was to retain a seat on the new company board and continue to provide development funding and support to the new owners. Following the departure of Todd Blackadder to join the Crusaders coaching setup in Super Rugby, Lynn Howells was appointed as head coach by Edinburgh's new executive chairman, Alex Carruthers.

==== Funding dispute and return to SRU: 2007 ====
In July 2007, a dispute arose between the Scottish Rugby Union and the owners of the newly franchised Edinburgh team. According to owner Bob Carruthers the SRU owed Edinburgh a six-figure sum which, he said, had not been paid. Carruthers also claimed that SRU had threatened to withdraw funding should Edinburgh continue with legal action relating to the sum. During the dispute, Alex Carruthers resigned along with then managing director Graeme Stirling. The dispute caused much disruption in Scottish rugby at the time, leading to the temporary withdrawal of 12 players from the Scotland squad training for the 2007 Rugby World Cup. This included leading players such as Chris Paterson and Mike Blair

The dispute escalated when, on 9 July 2007, Edinburgh revoked its associate membership of the SRU. This led to doubts about Edinburgh Rugby's ability to fulfil fixtures in the Celtic League and Heineken Cup and, whether or not Edinburgh players were insured for playing at club level. The resignation was withdrawn on 12 July, with Bob Carruthers being quoted as asking to "talk directly to someone" and insisting that the proposed signing of Australia stand-off Stephen Larkham would go ahead. Despite this, the dispute continued, with each party initiating legal action against the other. The situation was resolved in August 2007, with the termination of the franchise agreement and the return of Edinburgh to the direct control of the SRU.

=== Under Andy Robinson: 2007–2009 ===
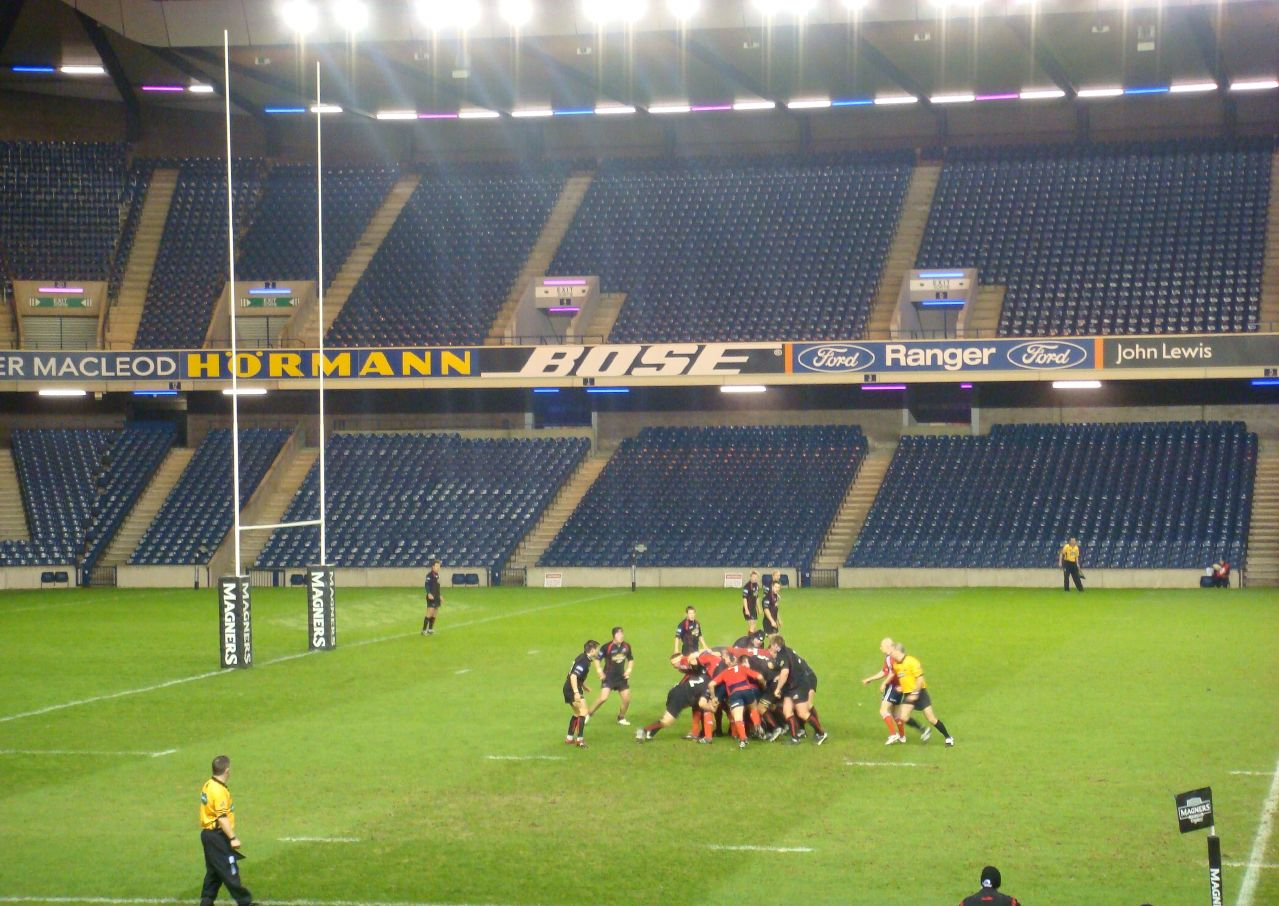
Edinburgh playing against Munster at Murrayfield Stadium in the 2007–08 Celtic League

Following the return to SRU control, the club coach Lynn Howells was dismissed. The SRU's Head of Player Development was appointed interim coach and Nic Cartwright was appointed as chief executive. Former British & Irish Lions captain Gavin Hastings was subsequently appointed as chairman, stating his "desire and passion to see this game and this club grow". The proposed signing of Stephen Larkham fell through after the SRU was unable to honour the terms of the agreement. This was seen as a disappointment, because the signing had been considered a coup for the beleaguered SRU when it was initially announced.

Following an application process, it was announced on 1 October 2007 that Andy Robinson, the former England head coach, would become the club's new head coach. Edinburgh showed progress under Robinson and performed well at home in the Heineken Cup, posting wins against Leinster and Leicester Tigers and a narrow loss to Toulouse, earning a bonus point. Following disappointing performances by Scotland in the 6 Nations, and Robinson co-coaching Scotland A, there were rumours of Robinson taking a post within the Scotland set-up after helping Edinburgh to climb to third in the Celtic League. This progress, however, was counter-pointed by some disappointing results including being shut out by Cardiff Blues at Murrayfield and losing the 1872 Challenge Cup on aggregate to rivals Glasgow Warriors.

On 26 December 2008, a new home record attendance of 12,534 saw the game against Glasgow Warriors. In the 2008–09 season Edinburgh reached their highest position finishing in second place behind Munster.

Andy Robinson left in 2009 to take up the position of head coach of the Scottish national side. Rob Moffat took over at Edinburgh. Michael Bradley was the new manager from 2011 to 2012.

=== Under Michael Bradley: 2011–2013 ===
Michael Bradley took over in May 2011 on a two-year contract.

The 2011–12 season saw the introduction of several young players into the squad including début seasons for 21-year-olds Matt Scott and Grant Gilchrist, 19-year-old Harry Leonard and first full seasons for back three players Tom Brown and Lee Jones plus the back row pair Stuart McInally and David Denton. Most of these players would become regular starters for the club and Jones, Brown, Scott, Gilchrist, McInally and Denton were destined for international honours. Domestically the season was not a success, with only 6 league wins out of 22 games, but the 2011–12 Heineken Cup campaign proved to be the most successful in the club's history when it topped Pool 2, including a remarkable home victory against Racing Métro by 48–47 - the largest Heineken Cup comeback in the league's history, having been losing 27–47 with just over ten minutes remaining - and setting up a quarter final against French rugby giants Toulouse by scoring four tries, and therefore a bonus point, against London Irish. The game against Toulouse in April 2012, was played before a new club record crowd of 37,881 and was closely contested, with Edinburgh holding out for a 19–14 win thanks to an early try from Mike Blair and penalties from captain Greig Laidlaw, setting up a semi-final in Dublin against Ulster. The semi-final was a close match but Ulster triumphed 22–19.

The 2012–13 season started with much expectation after the strengthening of the squad through the additions of W. P. Nel, John Yapp, Richie Rees, Dimitri Basilaia, Ben Atiga, Greig Tonks, Izak van der Westhuizen, and Andy Titterrell. These arrivals were however tempered by the loss of several experienced internationals, Mike Blair, Chris Paterson, Jim Thompson, Alan MacDonald, Esteban Lozada and Phil Godman among them. However, after another poor start to the Pro12 League, Edinburgh were then beaten 0–45 by Saracens at Murrayfield in the first round of Heineken Cup matches. This was followed by another high-scoring defeat when the team lost 33–0 to Munster Rugby at Thomond Park.

Following increasingly disappointing results and performances in the Pro12 league it was announced in February 2013 that Edinburgh would not be renewing Bradley's contract at the end of the season along with defence coach Billy McGinty. McGinty chose to leave his position with immediate effect with Bradley overseeing the defence until the end of the season. However, in a surprise move just a month later on 6 March 2013 Edinburgh announced that both Bradley and forwards coach Neil Back were being removed with immediate effect and coaches Stevie Scott and Duncan Hodge would take over until the end of the season.

In his final year to early March 2013 the Club lost all six matches in the Heineken Cup and recorded four league victories all season in the Pro12 against Cardiff, Zebre, Connacht and Ospreys. Edinburgh Rugby accumulated seven losing bonus points in this period highlighting the need for minor adjustments to change the sides fortunes on the pitch.

In the remaining five matches on the season Edinburgh won three, recording victories against Ulster, Zebre and Gwent Dragons to finish the season in 10th place in the Pro12 one place higher than the 2011–12 season.

=== Under Alan Solomons: 2013–2016 ===
Alan Solomons, formerly the coach of Western Province, Stormers, Ulster and more recently Super Rugby team the Kings, was appointed as head coach at the end of July 2013. Stevie Scott and Omar Mouneimne were appointed as assistant coaches.

Solomons' first season at the club was treated largely as a rebuilding period, with several players departing and replacements coming in. The league campaign culminated in an eighth-place finish.

2014–15 saw Edinburgh again finishing eighth, albeit with ten points and three victories more than the previous season. While the pre-season target of a top six finish wasn't achieved, there were other reasons to consider the campaign a success. The first came over the festive period when the team beat Glasgow Warriors over two legs to win the inter-city 1872 Cup for the first time in six seasons. After going down 16–6 in the first encounter at Scotstoun Stadium, the Murrayfield men turned the tables with a 20–8 victory in the return leg, with Tim Visser notching two first-half tries, to bring the trophy back to the capital for the first time since 2009. As the season reached its final stages, Edinburgh's excellent European form took them to within touching distance of more silverware.

Solomons left the club in September 2016 following a poor start to the season. Assistant coach Duncan Hodge was placed in temporary charge, and ultimately held the reins for the remainder of the campaign.

==== 2014–15 European Rugby Challenge Cup ====
By finishing top of their European Rugby Challenge Cup group (containing the French Top 14 pair Lyon and Bordeaux as well as English Premiership team London Welsh) they progressed to the knockout stage, where they were seeded fifth. They went on to beat fourth seed London Irish 18–23 in the quarter finals at the Madejski Stadium. In the semi-finals they thrashed the Newport Gwent Dragons an impressive 45–16 in front of a home crowd of over 8,000 at Murrayfield, making them the first Scottish team to ever reach a European final. They faced Gloucester in the final at the Twickenham Stoop on 2 May, losing 19–13.

=== Under Richard Cockerill: 2017–2021 ===
In February 2017, the club announced the appointment of former Leicester Tigers and Toulon Head Coach Richard Cockerill for the following season. Cockerill led the team to the play-offs of the 2017–18 Pro14 season, the first time the club have qualified for the end-of-season series since its introduction. Their season ended following a tight away defeat to Munster.

During his tenure, several Edinburgh players have made their international debuts for Scotland, including props Simon Berghan, Darryl Marfo and Murray McCallum, lock Lewis Carmichael, wing Darcy Graham, full-back Blair Kinghorn, hooker Dave Cherry, flankers Luke Hamilton and Jamie Ritchie, and former Edinburgh players Phil Burleigh, Cornell du Preez and George Turner, flanker Luke Crosbie, centres Chris Dean and James Johnstone, and scrum-halves Nathan Fowles, Sean Kennedy and Charlie Shiel were named in Scotland squads.

In addition, wing Duhan van der Merwe, prop Rory Sutherland, and flanker Hamish Watson have all toured with the British & Irish Lions in South Africa, with each one becoming a Test Lion in the first test match of the series, a 17–22 win for the Lions against the Springboks. However, in July 2021, Cockerill left Edinburgh by mutual consent. Former Scotland captain and Lions scrum-half Mike Blair has been appointed as the head coach for the 2021–22 season, Edinburgh's first in the new United Rugby Championship.

=== Under Mike Blair: 2021–2023 ===
Following a frustrating season, Edinburgh announced the immediate departure of head coach Richard Cockerill by "mutual consent" in July 2021 with Mike Blair (who was at the time part of the Scotland International set up) announced as the new head coach later that month. Blair's appointment coincided with new signings including Scotland international James Lang, South African Henry Immelman and Argentine utility back Emiliano Boffelli. Blair's appointment also saw the departure of longtime attack coach Duncan Hodge.

Blair's first game in charge was a 10-26 pre-season friendly loss to Newcastle Falcons; their first game in the new Edinburgh Rugby Stadium (since renamed the DAM Health Stadium, and then the Hive, for sponsorship reasons). Edinburgh made a good start to their first United Rugby Championship campaign and also the European Challenge Cup, where they beat Saracens 18–21 away in the first round.

In February 2023, Blair announced he would step down as head coach at the conclusion of the 2022/23 season

=== Under Sean Everitt: 2023– ===
Sean Everitt was recruited in July 2023 as a 'Senior Coach' to replace Blair for the 2023/24 season. This season saw modest results for the club, taking 11 wins, notably being the only team to emerge from Ulster's home stadium victorius. However, the team were crucially let down by only collecting five bonus points throughout the season, ultimately leading to them finishing tenth in the league, below Lions and Ospreys, despite having more wins than them.

Everitt signed a 2-year extension at the beginning of 2024 to remain at the club until June 2026 becoming Head Coach in the process.

As of the half-way point in the 2024–25 season, Edinburgh sit eighth in the URC table, with four wins from eight, all at home - but having already surpassed their bonus point total from the 2023–24 season. They sit top of Pool 3 in the Challenge Cup on points difference, with a loss away to Gloucester, and a win at home to Bayonne.

=== Stadia ===
Edinburgh Rugby have played at a number of grounds over the years including Meadowbank Stadium, Meggetland Sports Complex and most recently Myreside. It was recognised over the years by fans and players alike that Edinburgh have lacked a true Home Ground with BT Murrayfield often criticised for providing a poor atmosphere due to being largely empty for most games.

On 31 May 2018, Edinburgh Rugby announced a new proposed 7,800-seater Edinburgh Rugby Stadium to be built on the training pitches at Murrayfield. The stadium cost Scottish Rugby an estimated £5 million. The stadium was completed on 16 February 2021.

== Women's team ==
In December 2023, Edinburgh launched a women's team to compete in the Celtic Challenge, a cross-border competition that is designed to develop players for the Celtic nations, starting in the 2023–24 season.

== Current standings ==
=== United Rugby Championship ===
Pos	Team	Pld	W	D	L	PF	PA	PD	TF	TA	TB	LB	Pts	Qualification
1	Glasgow Warriors	18	13	0	5	479	338	+141	72	48	11	2	65	Qualification for the Champions Cup and knockout stage
2	Leinster (CH)	18	12	0	6	515	370	+145	77	51	13	2	63	Qualification for the Champions Cup and knockout stage
3	Stormers	18	12	1	5	504	344	+160	63	48	9	1	60	Qualification for the Champions Cup and knockout stage
4	Bulls (RU)	18	12	0	6	576	406	+170	82	59	10	1	59	Qualification for the Champions Cup and knockout stage
5	Munster	18	11	0	7	396	376	+20	59	51	8	3	55	Qualification for the Champions Cup and knockout stage
6	Cardiff	18	11	0	7	353	372	−19	52	52	7	4	55	Qualification for the Champions Cup and knockout stage
7	Lions	18	10	1	7	532	473	+59	73	70	9	3	54	Qualification for the Champions Cup and knockout stage
8	Connacht	18	10	0	8	442	395	+47	62	56	10	4	54	Qualification for the Champions Cup and knockout stage
9	Ulster	18	9	1	8	494	420	+74	72	60	10	4	52	Qualification for the Challenge Cup
10	Sharks	18	8	1	9	467	428	+39	71	57	9	3	46	Qualification for the Challenge Cup
11	Ospreys	18	7	2	9	376	454	−78	55	69	4	3	39	Qualification for the Challenge Cup
12	Edinburgh	18	7	0	11	362	439	−77	57	66	6	4	38	Qualification for the Challenge Cup
13	Benetton	18	6	2	10	327	493	−166	41	71	4	1	33	Qualification for the Challenge Cup
14	Scarlets	18	4	2	12	361	460	−99	52	63	3	5	28	Qualification for the Challenge Cup
15	Dragons	18	3	4	11	350	481	−131	46	71	4	4	28	Qualification for the Challenge Cup
16	Zebre	18	2	0	16	312	587	−275	43	85	3	4	15	Qualification for the Challenge Cup

Updated to match(es) played on 16 May 2026. Source: UnitedRugby.com
Rules for classification: Tiebreakers for teams tied on points: 1) Number of matches won 2) The difference between points for and points against 3) The number of tries scored 4) The most points scored 5) The difference between tries for and tries against 6) The fewest red cards received 7) The fewest yellow cards received.

=== European Champions Cup ===
European Rugby Champions Cup Pool 2
Pos	Team	Pld	W	D	L	PF	PA	PD	TF	TA	TB	LB	Pts	Qualification
1	(England) Bath (4)	4	3	0	1	180	89	+91	25	10	4	0	16	Home Champions Cup round of 16
2	(France) Toulon (7)	4	3	0	1	123	106	+17	14	13	2	0	14	Home Champions Cup round of 16
3	(France) Castres (12)	4	2	0	2	98	106	−8	13	15	2	0	10	Away Champions Cup round of 16
4	(Scotland) Edinburgh (14)	4	2	0	2	69	140	−71	9	18	2	0	10	Away Champions Cup round of 16
5	(Ireland) Munster (10CC)	4	1	0	3	99	101	−2	15	13	2	2	8	Away Challenge Cup round of 16
6	(England) Gloucester	4	1	0	3	75	102	−27	8	15	1	1	6	

Source: EPCR
Rules for classification: Tiebreakers for teams tied on points: 1) Number of matches won; 2) Difference between points for and against; 3) Total number of points for; 4) Aggregate number of points scored in matches between tied teams; 5) Number of matches won excluding the first match, then the second and so on until the tie is settled.

== Honours ==
- European Rugby Challenge Cup (Note: Formerly known as European Challenge Cup)
  - Runners-up: 1 (2015)
- United Rugby Championship (Note: Formerly known as Celtic League/Magners League, Pro12 and Pro14)
  - Runners-up: 1 (2009)
  - Scottish-Italian Shield: 1 (2022)
- Scottish Inter-District Championship / Scottish League
  - Winners: 3 (1997–98), (1998–99), (2002–03)
- 1872 Cup
  - Winners: 7 (2008–09), (2014–15), (2015–16), (2017–18), (2018–19), (2019–20), (2021–22)
- Celtic Cup
  - Runners Up: 1 (2003–04)
- Melrose Sevens
  - Winners: 1 (2016)
- Glasgow City Sevens
  - Winners: 2 (2005, 2006)
- Capital Sevens
  - Winners: (2007, 2014, 2015)

== Coaching staff ==
- Head coach: Sean Everitt
- Assistant skills coach: Robert Chrystie
- Forwards coach: Stevie Lawrie
- Defence coach: Michael Todd
- Attack and backs coach: Scott Mathie

== Current squad ==
2026-27 Edinburgh squad
**Props**: (Scotland) Ollie Blyth-Lafferty; (Scotland) **Alec Hepburn**; (England) **Paul Hill**; (England) Rhys Litterick *; (Scotland) **D'Arcy Rae**; (Scotland) **Pierre Schoeman**; (England) James Whitcombe *; **Hookers**: (Scotland) **Ewan Ashman**; (Scotland) Jerry Blyth-Lafferty; (Scotland) **Patrick Harrison**; (Scotland) **Harri Morris**; (Scotland) **Dylan Richardson**; **Locks**: (Scotland) Rob Carmichael; (Scotland) **Grant Gilchrist**; (Scotland) Callum Hunter-Hill; (Scotland) Euan McVie; (Scotland) **Marshall Sykes**; (Scotland) **Glen Young**	**Back row**: (Scotland) **Magnus Bradbury** **(c)**; (Scotland) Connor Boyle; (Scotland) **Luke Crosbie**; (Scotland) Tom Currie; (Scotland) Tom Dodd; (Scotland) **Freddy Douglas**; (Scotland) Ollie Duncan; (Scotland) **Liam McConnell**; (Scotland) **Ben Muncaster**; **Scrum-halves**: (New Zealand) Louie Chapman *; (Scotland) Conor McAlpine; (Scotland) Hector Patterson; (Scotland) **Ben Vellacott**; **Fly-halves**: (England) James Grayson; (Scotland) Cammy Scott; (Scotland) **Ross Thompson**	**Centres**: (Scotland) **Matt Currie**; (Scotland) Geordie Gwynn; (New Zealand) Kienan Higgins *; (New Zealand) Riley Higgins *; (England) Charlie McCaig *; (England) Piers O'Conor; (Scotland) Mosese Tuipulotu; **Wings**: (New Zealand) Wes Goosen; (Scotland) **Darcy Graham**; (Scotland) Malelili Satala; (Scotland) **Duhan van der Merwe**; **Fullbacks**: (Scotland) Jack Brown; (Scotland) **Harry Paterson**
**(c)** denotes the team captain. **Bold** denotes internationally capped players. * denotes players qualified to play for Scotland on residency or dual nationality. Taking into account signings and departures ahead of 2026-27 season as listed on List of 2026-27 United Rugby Championship transfers. Source:

=== Academy players ===
2026-27 Edinburgh academy squad
**Props**: (Scotland) Oliver Anderson; (Scotland) Jamie Stewart; (Scotland) Ben White; **Hookers**: (Scotland) Jack Utterson; **Locks**: (Scotland) Sam Byrd; (Scotland) Christian Lindsay; (Scotland) Toby Overson	**Back row**: (Scotland) Archie Appleby; (Scotland) Harry Jackaman; **Scrum-halves**: (Scotland) Matthew Fick; (Scotland) Hamish MacArthur; (Scotland) Adam Mckenzie; **Fly-halves**: (Scotland) Henry Widdowson; (Scotland) Ross Wolfenden	**Centres**: (Scotland) Henry Kesterton; (Scotland) Ben McDonald; (Scotland) Harry Soboil; (Scotland) Findlay Thomson; **Wings**: (Scotland) Finlay Doyle; (Scotland) Dan Kelly; (Scotland) Rory McHaffie; (Scotland) Nairn Moncrieff; **Fullbacks**
**(c)** denotes the team captain. **Bold** denotes internationally capped players. * denotes players qualified to play for Scotland on residency or dual nationality. Taking into account signings and departures ahead of 2026-27 season as listed on List of 2026-27 United Rugby Championship transfers. Source:

== Former players and present and past coaches ==
While still an amateur side, Edinburgh District capped the Royal HSFP forward James Robertson in the 1870s. Robertson was the first black person to play rugby union.

=== Notable former players ===
Former players who have played for Edinburgh and have more than 20 caps for their respective country.

- (Canada) Ander Monro
- (Canada) Mike Pyke
- (Fiji) Netani Talei
- (New Zealand) Todd Blackadder
- (New Zealand) Dave Hewett
- (Scotland) John Barclay
- (Scotland) Simon Berghan
- (Scotland) Mike Blair
- (Scotland) Geoff Cross
- (Scotland) Nick De Luca
- (Scotland) Rob Dewey
- (Scotland) Alasdair Dickinson
- (Scotland) Marcus Di Rollo
- (Scotland) Ross Ford
- (Scotland) Phil Godman
- (Scotland) Ryan Grant
- (Scotland) Dougie Hall
- (Scotland) Jim Hamilton
- (Scotland) Nathan Hines
- (Scotland) Duncan Hodge
- (Scotland) Ally Hogg
- (Scotland) Allan Jacobsen
- (Scotland) Alastair Kellock
- (Scotland) Blair Kinghorn
- (Scotland) Greig Laidlaw
- (Scotland) Brendan Laney
- (Scotland) Rory Lawson
- (Fiji) Viliame Mata
- (Scotland) Stuart McInally
- (Scotland) Scott Murray
- (Scotland) WP Nel
- (Scotland) Chris Paterson
- (Scotland) Henry Pyrgos
- (Scotland) Craig Smith
- (Scotland) Hugo Southwell
- (Scotland) Alasdair Strokosch
- (Scotland) Rory Sutherland
- (Scotland) Simon Taylor
- (Scotland) Ben Toolis
- (Scotland) Tim Visser
- (Scotland) Simon Webster

=== Coaches ===
- (South Africa) Sean Everitt 2023–present
- (England) Steve Diamond 2023 (interim)
- (Scotland) Mike Blair 2021–2023
- (England) Richard Cockerill 2017–2021
- (Scotland) Duncan Hodge 2016–2017 (interim)
- (South Africa) Alan Solomons 2013–2016
- (Scotland) Stevie Scott 2013 (interim)
- (Ireland) Michael Bradley 2011–2013
- (Australia) Nick Scrivener 2011 (interim)
- (Scotland) Rob Moffat 2009–2011
- (England) Andy Robinson 2007–2009
- (Scotland) Henry Edwards 2007 (interim)
- (Wales) Lynn Howells 2006–2007
- (New Zealand) Todd Blackadder 2005–2006
- (Scotland) Frank Hadden 2000–2005
- (Scotland) Bob Easson 2000
- (Scotland) Ian Rankin 1998–2000
- (Scotland) Bob Easson 1997-98
- (Scotland) Ian Barnes 1997
- (Scotland) Graham Hogg 1996

== Statistics by season ==
=== Heineken Cup / Rugby Champions Cup ===
Season	Pos	Played	Won	Lost	Drawn	Source
1996–97	Pools	4	0	4	0	
1998–99	Pools	6	2	3	1	
1999–00	Pools	6	3	3	0	
2000–01	Pools	6	3	2	1	
2001–02	Pools	6	1	4	1	
2002–03	Pools	6	2	4	0	
2003–04	Pools	6	5	1	0	
2003–04	Playoffs	Quarter-finals; Stade Toulousain 36 – 10 Edinburgh				
2004–05	Pools	6	1	5	0	
2005–06	Pools	6	2	4	0	
2006–07	Pools	6	1	5	0	
2007–08	Pools	6	2	4	0	
2008–09	Pools	6	2	4	0	
2009–10	Pools	6	3	3	0	
2010–11	Pools	6	1	5	0	
2011–12	Pools	6	5	1	0	
2011–12	Playoffs	Semi-finals; Ulster 22 – 19 Edinburgh				
2012–13	Pools	6	0	6	0	
2013–14	Pools	6	3	3	0	
2018–19	Pools	6	5	1	0	
2018–19	Playoffs	Quarter-finals; Edinburgh 13 – 17 Munster				
2020–21	Pools	2	1	1	0	
2020–21	Playoffs	Round of 16; Racing 92 56 – 3 Edinburgh				
2022–23	Pools	4	3	1	0	
2022–23	Playoffs	Round of 16; Leicester Tigers 16 – 6 Edinburgh				
2025–26	Pools	4	2	2	0	
2025–26	Playoffs	Round of 16; Leinster 49 – 31 Edinburgh				

=== European Challenge Cup / Rugby Challenge Cup ===
Season	Pos	Played	Won	Lost	Drawn	Source
1997–98	Pools	6	2	4	0	
2014–15	Pools	6	5	1	0	
2014–15	Playoffs	Final; Edinburgh 13 – 19 Gloucester Rugby				
2015–16	Pools	6	4	2	0	
2016–17	Pools	6	5	1	0	
2016–17	Playoffs	Quarter-final; Edinburgh 22 – 32 La Rochelle				
2017–18	Pools	6	5	1	0	
2017–18	Playoffs	Quarter-final; Edinburgh 6 – 20 Cardiff Blues				
2019–20	Pools	6	4	1	1	
2019–20	Playoffs	Quarter-final; Bordeaux Bègles 23 – 14 Edinburgh				
2021–22	Pools	4	3	1	0	
2021–22	Playoffs	Quarter-final; Edinburgh 30 – 34 Wasps				
2023–24	Pools	4	2	2	0	
2023–24	Playoffs	Quarter-final; Edinburgh 30 – 36 Sharks				
2024-25	Pools	4	3	1	0	
2024-25	Playoffs	Semi-final; Edinburgh 24-39 Bath				

=== Celtic League ===
Season	Pool/Conference	Pos	Played	Won	Lost	Drawn
2001–02	Pool B (7 teams)	6th	6	2	4	0
2001–02	Playoffs	Did not qualify				
2002–03	Pool A (8 teams)	2nd	7	6	1	0
2002–03	Playoffs	Quarter-finals; Edinburgh 22 – 26 Cardiff Blues				
2003–04	League (12 teams)	10th	22	9	13	0
2004–05	League (11 teams)	7th	20	9	11	0
2005–06	League (11 teams)	5th	20	11	9	0
2006–07	League (11 teams)	8th	20	8	11	1
2007–08	League (10 teams)	4th	18	9	6	3
2008–09	League (10 teams)	2nd	18	11	7	0
2009–10	League (10 teams)	6th	18	8	10	0
2009–10	Playoffs	Did not qualify				
2010–11	League (12 teams)	8th	22	8	13	0
2010–11	Playoffs	Did not qualify				

=== Pro12 ===
Season	Pool/Conference	Pos	Played	Won	Lost	Drawn
2011–12	League (12 teams)	11th	22	6	15	1
2011–12	Playoffs	Did not qualify				
2012–13	League (12 teams)	10th	22	7	15	0
2012–13	Playoffs	Did not qualify				
2013–14	League (12 teams)	8th	22	7	15	0
2013–14	Playoffs	Did not qualify				
2014–15<	League (12 teams)	8th	22	10	11	1
2014–15<	Playoffs	Did not qualify				
2015–16	League (12 teams)	9th	22	11	11	0
2015–16	Playoffs	Did not qualify				
2016–17	League (12 teams)	9th	22	6	16	0
2016–17	Playoffs	Did not qualify				

=== Pro14 ===
Season	Pool/Conference	Pos	Played	Won	Lost	Drawn
2017–18	Conference B (7 teams)	3rd	21	15	6	0
2017–18	Playoffs	Quarter-finals; Munster 20 – 16 Edinburgh				
2018–19	Conference B (7 teams)	5th	21	10	11	0
2018–19	Playoffs	Did not qualify				
2019–20	Conference B (7 teams)	1st	15	11	4	0
2019–20	Playoffs	Semi-finals; Edinburgh 19 – 22 Ulster				
2020–21	Conference B (7 teams)	5th	16	5	10	1
2020–21	Playoffs	No playoffs (COVID-19)				

=== Pro14 Rainbow Cup ===
Season	Pool/Conference	Pos	Played	Won	Lost	Drawn
2021	League (12 teams)	9th	5	1	3	1
2021	Playoffs	No playoffs				

=== United Rugby Championship ===
Season	Pool/Conference	Pos	Played	Won	Lost	Drawn
2021–22	League (16 teams)	7th	18	10	7	1
2021–22	Playoffs	Quarter finals Stormers 28 – 17 Edinburgh				
2022–23	League (16 teams)	12th	18	6	12	0
2022–23	Playoffs	Did not qualify				
2023–24	League (16 teams)	10th	18	11	7	0
2023–24	Playoffs	Did not qualify				
2024–25	League (16 teams)	7th	18	8	9	1
2024–25	Playoffs	Quarter finals Bulls 42 – 33 Edinburgh				
2025–26	League (16 teams)	12th	18	7	11	0
2025–26	Playoffs	Did not qualify				

=== Scottish League ===
Season	Pos	Played	Won	Lost	Drawn
2002–03	1st	8	5	2	1

=== Welsh/Scottish League ===
Season	Pos	Played	Won	Lost	Drawn
1999–00	8th	22	10	11	1
2000–01	8th	22	11	11	0
2001–02	6th	20	10	8	2

== Edinburgh and District ==
The Tennents Premiership is the premier club competition over the Edinburgh region. The district includes clubs from the council areas: City of Edinburgh, West Lothian, Midlothian and East Lothian.

Currently four district clubs compete at the top level of amateur rugby in Scotland.

=== National leagues ===
BT National League is an amateur league competition for rugby union clubs in Scotland. It forms the second tier of the Scottish League Championship.

=== East leagues ===
The East leagues cover the Edinburgh & District and the Scottish Borders area. They play at a level below that of the National Leagues structure. Winners of the league may progress to the National League.

=== The clubs ===
Edinburgh and District consists of 32 clubs.

==== City of Edinburgh ====
There are 20 clubs in the City of Edinburgh council area.

- Currie
- Boroughmuir
- Heriot's
- Edinburgh Academical FC
- Stewart's Melville FP RFC
- Watsonians FC
- Murrayfield Wanderers FC
- Portobello FP
- Forrester RFC
- Inverleith RFC
- Leith Rugby Club
- Trinity Academicals RFC
- Liberton RFC
- Edinburgh Northern RFC
- Lismore RFC
- Broughton RFC
- Queensferry RFC
- RDVC RFC
- Edinburgh University Medics RFC
- Corstorphine RFC
- Barnton RFC

==== East Lothian ====
There are 6 clubs in East Lothian.

- Musselburgh RFC
- Haddington RFC
- Preston Lodge RFC
- North Berwick RFC
- Dunbar RFC
- Ross High RFC

==== West Lothian ====
There are 2 clubs in West Lothian.

- Livingston RFC
- Linlithgow RFC

==== Midlothian ====
There are 3 clubs in Midlothian.

- Lasswade RFC
- Dalkeith RFC
- Penicuik RFC
