= Border League =

Scottish rugby union league

- Sport: Rugby union
- Founded: 1901
- No. of teams: 7
- Countries: Scotland
- Most recent champion: Gala RFC

The Border League, currently known as the Booker Border League, after its sponsors, is the oldest competitive club rugby union league in the world. It is contested each year by seven teams from the Scottish Borders, the only area of Scotland where rugby is the most popular sport.

The Borders has always been a stronghold of rugby union, coupled with the competitive rivalry that exists between the local Border towns, derbies are something to behold, with the teams fighting for pride as well as league points.

Although originally the premier tournament for its clubs, the formation of a league system in the 1970s means that Border clubs now play in the Scottish League Championship as well as the Border League.

The current holders are Gala RFC.

== History ==
By tradition, the two main strongholds of Scottish rugby have been the cluster of towns that flank the River Tweed in the Borders, and the private schools of Glasgow and Edinburgh. Although this situation has changed somewhat, the Borders still exert a disproportionate influence upon the Scottish game and have made a major contribution to world rugby in the form of rugby sevens.

Between them the two camps have directly or indirectly provided the vast majority of Scotland's international players, but their different traditions have produced an enmity based as much on class as geography.

That tension was evident even in the late Victorian period, when rugby's popularity was growing in both areas. In the Borders where clubs such as Hawick, Gala and Jed Forest were largely working-class institutions, there was a resentment of the haughty control exerted by representatives of city schools on the Scottish Football Union (as the SRU was known then).

On more than one occasion, the mutual distrust almost led to the creation of a breakaway group that would have mirrored developments in England, where the rebel Northern League produced the game of rugby league.

The Border sides, however, remained in the Scottish rugby union fold. Yet their desire for more meaningful rugby at a time when the SRU viewed that concept with disdain, was to produce in the 1901–02 season, the Border League, the championship which is now the game's oldest and most established competitive club league.

The League's original members were Gala, Hawick, Langholm, Melrose and Jed Forest. In 1912, Selkirk and Kelso joined to bring the competition up to seven teams, a number which did not change until 1996, when Peebles after years of lobbying, was admitted into the competition.

Throughout its history, the League has been contested on a home and away basis. surviving even the introduction of National Leagues in 1973. Then with a fine sense of irony, the Border clubs opposed the arrival of the national championship, fearful of the effect it would have on their own competition.

By the end of the 2023–24 season, Hawick's 51 Border titles – outright or shared – made them easily the most successful side. Melrose had won 20, Gala 12, Jed Forest 10, Selkirk 7, Kelso 5 and Langholm 1. Peebles have never won the Border League. Recent innovations have included play-offs, when the League produces a tie, and a points for tries system.

== Teams (2024–25) ==
- Gala RFC
- Hawick RFC
- Jed-Forest RFC
- Kelso RFC
- Melrose RFC
- Peebles RFC
- Selkirk RFC

== Membership issues ==
Following their failure to fulfil any fixtures during 2005–2006, many anticipated Duns RFC withdrawing or being replaced – either by local rivals Earlston RFC, who are the largest Scottish Borders club not to participate in the Border League, or possibly by Eyemouth RFC (who have since disbanded as a league club), St Boswells RFC or Walkerburn RFC who while being far down the national league structure, come from towns currently unrepresented. Calls for Biggar RFC (geographically just outside the Scottish Borders but a major Scottish club) were also made.

However, Duns RFC retained their place, and confirmed their status by playing their first fixture of the season before the National League season had even began. They were resoundingly beaten 62–7 by Peebles RFC on Saturday 19 August 2006.

Duns, failed to make the grade for the following season and were replaced by Haddington RFC from East Lothian who were felt to be a suitable team as they play in Division 2 of the national league set-up.
