= Peebles Sevens =

Annual rugby sevens event held by Peebles RFC, in Peebles, Scotland

- Sport: Rugby sevens
- Instituted: 1923
- Number of teams: 16
- Country: Scotland
- Holders: (Scotland) Jed-Forest (2020)
- Related competition: Kings of the Sevens

Peebles Sevens is an annual rugby sevens event held by Peebles RFC, in Peebles, Scotland. This was one of a group of Sevens tournaments instated after the First World War extending the original Borders Spring Circuit. The Peebles Sevens began in 1923.

Due to a calendar change in 2016; the tournament was moved from end-of-season to start-of-season. Hence 2016 shows two winners:- one for 2015–16 season and one for 2016–17 season. Subsequent tournaments were held as start of season Sevens. The 2018 winner (for season 2018–19) is Melrose.

The Peebles Sevens is part of the Kings of the Sevens championship run by the Border League.

This event was one of the first Sevens tournaments in the Borders to run with a 12-person squad in 2018–19 season, as opposed to a 10-person squad. It also featured rolling substitutions.

== Sports Day ==
The Peebles Sevens began as a sports day to raise money for the new season of Peebles RFC.

== Invited Sides ==
Various sides have been invited to play in the Peebles Sevens tournament throughout the years. Newcastle Falcons won the event in 2004. Orkney RFC was invited on 2015, as was the Army.

== Sponsorship ==
The Sevens tournament was sponsored by So Stobo and Green Field Marquees in 2018–19 season.

== Past winners ==
- 2023 (Scotland) Watsonians
- 2022 (Scotland) Hearts and Balls
- 2021 No event
- 2020 (Scotland) Jed-Forest
- 2019 (Scotland) Melrose
- 2018 (Scotland) Melrose
- 2017 (Scotland) Watsonians
- 2016 (Scotland) Melrose
- 2016 (Scotland) Selkirk
- 2015 (Scotland) Gala
- 2014 (Scotland) Melrose
- 2013 (Scotland) Melrose
- 2012 (Scotland) Watsonians
- 2011 (Scotland) Peebles
- 2010 (Scotland) Melrose
- 2009 (Scotland) Melrose
- 2008 (Scotland) Watsonians
- 2007 (Scotland) Watsonians
- 2006 (Scotland) Boroughmuir
- 2005 (Scotland) Watsonians
- 2004 (England) Newcastle Falcons
- 2003 (Scotland) Boroughmuir
- 2002 (Scotland) Peebles
- 2001 (Scotland) Peebles
- 2000 (Scotland) Jed-Forest
- 1999 (Scotland) Watsonians
- 1998 (Scotland) Kelso
- 1997 (Scotland) Musselburgh
- 1996 (Scotland) Corstorphine
- 1995 (Scotland) Biggar
- 1994 (Scotland) Preston Lodge
- 1993 (Scotland) Biggar
- 1992 (Scotland) Peebles
- 1991 (Scotland) Currie
- 1990 (Scotland) Portobello
- 1989 (Scotland) Edinburgh Accies
- 1988 (Scotland) Musselburgh
- 1987 (Scotland) Portobello
- 1986 (Scotland) Musselburgh
- 1985 (Scotland) Heriots
- 1984 (Scotland) Edinburgh Accies
- 1983 (Scotland) Heriots
- 1982 (Scotland) Haddington
- 1981 (Scotland) Preston Lodge
- 1980 (Scotland) Boroughmuir
- 1979 (Scotland) Melrose
- 1978 (Scotland) Heriots
- 1977 (Scotland) Haddington
- 1976 (Scotland) Melrose
- 1975 (Scotland) Royal HSFP
- 1974 (Scotland) Melrose
- 1973 (Scotland) Leith Academicals
- 1972 (Scotland) Watsonians
- 1971 (Scotland) Melrose
- 1970 (Scotland) Melrose
- 1969 (Scotland) Boroughmuir
- 1968 (Scotland) Melrose
- 1967 (Scotland) Trinity Academicals
- 1966 (Scotland) Trinity Academicals
- 1965 (Scotland) Melville College FP
- 1964 (Scotland) Heriots
- 1963 Abandoned
- 1962 (Scotland) Trinity Academicals
- 1961 (Scotland) Gala
- 1960 (Scotland) Melrose
- 1959 (Scotland) Boroughmuir
- 1958 (Scotland) Heriots
- 1957 (Scotland) Gala
- 1956 (Scotland) Watsonians
- 1955 (Scotland) Watsonians
- 1954 (Scotland) Gala
- 1953 (Scotland) Heriots
- 1952 (Scotland) Watsonians
- 1951 (Scotland) Heriots
- 1950 (Scotland) Walkerburn
- 1949 (Scotland) Edinburgh City Police
- 1948 (Scotland) Edinburgh City Police
- 1947 (Scotland) Edinburgh Accies
- 1946 (Scotland) Royal HSFP
- 1941-1945 Second World War
- 1940 (Scotland) Melville College FP
- 1939 (Scotland) Watsonians
- 1938 (Scotland) Edinburgh City Police
- 1937 (Scotland) Watsonians
- 1936 (Scotland) Watsonians
- 1935 (Scotland) Leith Academicals
- 1934 (Scotland) Walkerburn
- 1933 (Scotland) Selkirk
- 1932 (Scotland) Melrose
- 1931 (Scotland) Walkerburn
- 1930 (Scotland) Walkerburn
- 1929 (Scotland) Selkirk
- 1928 (Scotland) Walkerburn
- 1927 (Scotland) Selkirk 'A'
- 1926 (Scotland) Hawick 'A'
- 1925 (Scotland) Walkerburn
- 1924 (Scotland) Gala 'A'
- 1923 (Scotland) Walkerburn

== See also ==
- Peebles RFC
- Borders Sevens Circuit
- Scottish Rugby Union
