= Gordon Dixon (rugby union) =

Scottish rugby union player & RU administrator

- Born: William Gordon Dixon; August 1949 (age 76–77)

Rugby union career
Amateur team(s)
Years	Team	Apps	(Points)
-	Duns RFC		

118th President of the Scottish Rugby Union
- In office 2004–2005
- Preceded by: Bert Duffy
- Succeeded by: Andy Irvine

Gordon Dixon is a Scottish former rugby union player. He was the 118th President of the Scottish Rugby Union.

== Rugby Union career ==
=== Amateur career ===
He played for Duns.

=== Administrative career ===
Dixon became the 118th President of the Scottish Rugby Union. He served the standard one year from 2004 to 2005.

Dixon had to deal with the resignation of SRU Chairman David Mackay during his presidency; with unquiet among the clubs over Mackay's chairmanship. He stated: 'There is never a right time to make announcements such as this. Clearly we have been listening to the concerns of the member clubs, the key stakeholders in Scottish Rugby, and these changes are as a consequence of their concerns.'

A Special General Meeting had to be called to chart the way forward for the SRU. Dixon made a statement to the press:

"The SGM was always about what the clubs wanted and they have stated that they want the issue of governance in Scottish rugby debated, so it will be. The amendment proposed by Heriot's on governance and supported by many clubs across the country, suggests on-going discussion to provide an acceptable solution in time for the AGM in June and we concur totally with that. To that end the current governance working party will re-convene - augmented by club expertise - and I expect there to be progress on governance as a matter of urgency. The priority now for everyone involved is to pull together to take the game in our country forward in the interests of Scottish Rugby. For that reason there will be no further separate communication from the General Committee or its members. All further statements will be on behalf of Scottish Rugby. We also hope to be able to announce the appointment of new non-executive directors by the middle of this week because it is important that we focus on the priorities of the game as much as possible. The appointments, as is the case with (short-term SRU chief executive and chairman) Fred McLeod, would be on an interim basis to the AGM in June. I believe the general committee should simply seek to work in effective management partnership with executive staff. That does not mean a hands-on approach but working within a fully integrated structure that promotes accountability, transparency and mutual trust. Communication must be the bedrock of the way ahead."

He was Director of Rugby at Linlithgow rugby club from 2016 to 2019.
