= Grant McKelvey =

Scotland international rugby union player

- Born: Grant McKelvey; 28 December 1968 (age 57) Chingola, Zambia
- Height: 5 ft 8 in (173 cm)
- Weight: 216 lb (98 kg)
- School: Knox Academy

Rugby union career
- Position: Hooker
Amateur team(s)
Years	Team	Apps	(Points)
- Haddington
–	Watsonians		
Senior career
Years	Team	Apps	(Points)
- Edinburgh
International career
Years	Team	Apps	(Points)
1997	Scotland	1	(0)

Grant McKelvey (born 28 December 1968) is a senior manager at the Scottish Rugby Union who has also worked as a rugby union coach. He was previously a Scotland international rugby union player.

== Early life ==
McKelvey was born on 28 December 1968 in Chingola, Zambia. He went to Knox Academy in Haddington.

== Rugby Union career ==
=== Amateur career ===
He started off playing for Haddington and then played for Watsonians.

=== Professional and provincial career ===
He was named as a replacement in the Cities District side to play Australia in October 1996. However he did not play.

McKelvey played for Edinburgh Rugby.

=== International career ===
He played for the Scottish Schools under-15s in 1984.

He played one Autumn international match as hooker for Scotland against Australia at Murrayfield on 22 November 1997.

=== Coaching career ===
In July 2000 the Reivers announced that he had left their squad to concentrate on his work as a SRU development officer in East Lothian.

He coached Musselburgh RFC until 2003 when he became the rugby development manager for Edinburgh.

In 2007 he became the Scotland national under-18 rugby union team coach, having previously coached the under-17 team. In December 2014 he became a talent identification and performance projects manager.
