= Moray House RFC =

- Full name: Moray House Rugby Football Club
- Founded: 1925
- Location: Edinburgh, Scotland
- Ground(s): Jack Kane Centre, Niddrie
- League(s): East Non-League
- 2019–20: East Non-League
Team kit

Official website
- www.pitchero.com/clubs/morayhouserfc

Moray House RFC is a rugby union club based in Edinburgh, Scotland.

== History ==
This is the rugby union club attached to the Moray House School of Education and Sport within the University of Edinburgh.

It was founded from at least 1925, the club playing Kirkcaldy 2nd XV on 13 March 1926 in the Fife side's 1925 fixture list.

George Russell was a stalwart of the rugby side (and ultimately became its president for many years); and he later went on to represent Edinburgh District, and join the Scottish Rugby Union committee. Russell died in 2020.

The club had to get re-founded after the second world war and some histories take the 1946 re-founding date as the new date.

The club dropped its Former Pupils tag when the School closed in the 1950s. However the School survived in one form or another by linking with various educational establishments:- Dunfermline College, then Heriot-Watt University, and presently the University of Edinburgh.

However through all the moves the club lost its Prestonfield home, and they now play in the Jack Kane Centre at Niddrie.

== Sides ==
The club trains on Tuesday nights.

The club is now an open side and takes players without a connection to Moray House.

== Honours ==
- Leith Sevens
  - Champions (1): 2015
- Edinburgh Northern Sevens
  - Champions (1): 1957
- Edinburgh District Sevens
  - Champions (2): 1936, 1952

== Notable former players ==
=== Men ===
==== Edinburgh District ====
The following former Moray House RFC players have represented Edinburgh District.

- (Scotland) George Russell
