= Edinburgh Northern Sevens =

Rugby sevens tournament in Scotland

- Sport: Rugby sevens
- Instituted: 1955
- Number of teams: 21
- Country: Scotland
- Holders: (Scotland) Currie (2023)
- Most titles: (Scotland) Liberton (6 titles)

Edinburgh Northern Sevens is an annual rugby sevens tournament held by Edinburgh Northern, in the Inverleith district of Edinburgh, Scotland.

== History ==
The first rugby sevens tournament took place in 1955 and it has been played in all subsequent years, with the exception of the coronavirus pandemic years in 2019 and 2020.

The 2023 tournament, won by Currie, had 21 sides taking part.

== Northern Cup ==
The winners receive the Northern Cup. There is also a Bowl and Plate competition.

== Sponsorship ==
The event is sponsored by Blyth and Blyth, engineering consultants.

== Past winners ==
=== Men ===
- 2023 (Scotland) Currie
- 2022 (Scotland) Currie
- 2021 (Scotland) no event
- 2020 (Scotland) no event
- 2019 (Scotland) Boroughmuir
- 2018 (Scotland) Watsonians
- 2017 (Scotland) Watsonians
- 2016 (Scotland) Currie
- 2015 (Scotland) Edinburgh Academicals
- 2014 (Scotland) Currie
- 2013 (Scotland) Musselburgh
- 2012 (Scotland) Heriots
- 2011 (Scotland) Boroughmuir
- 2010 (Scotland) Lismore
- 2009 (Scotland) Rodents
- 2008 (Scotland) Hamilton
- 2007 (Scotland) Heriots
- 2006 (Scotland) Stewart's Melville
- 2005 (Scotland) Royal Scots
- 2004 (Scotland) Royal High Corstorphine
- 2003 (Scotland) Stewart's Melville
- 2002 (Scotland) Royal Scots
- 2001 (Scotland) Royal Scots
- 2000 (Scotland) Watsonians
- 1999 (Scotland) Heriots
- 1998 (Scotland) Livingston
- 1997 (Scotland) Edinburgh Academicals
- 1996 (Scotland) Livingston
- 1995 (Scotland) Corstorphine
- 1994 (Scotland) Heriots
- 1993 (Scotland) Royal HSFP
- 1992 (Scotland) Edinburgh Wanderers
- 1991 (Scotland) Presidents VII
- 1990 (Scotland) Edinburgh Wanderers
- 1989 (Scotland) Royal HSFP
- 1988 (Scotland) Heriots
- 1987 (Scotland) Linlithgow
- 1986 (Scotland) Lismore
- 1985 (Scotland) Linlithgow
- 1984 (Scotland) Linlithgow
- 1983 (Scotland) Lismore
- 1982 (Scotland) Currie
- 1981 (Scotland) Lismore
- 1980 (Scotland) Lismore
- 1979 (Scotland) Currie
- 1978 (Scotland) Livingston
- 1977 (Scotland) Livingston
- 1976 (Scotland) Penicuik
- 1975 (Scotland) Liberton
- 1974 (Scotland) Forrester
- 1973 (Scotland) Liberton
- 1972 (Scotland) Liberton
- 1971 (Scotland) Liberton
- 1970 (Scotland) Portobello
- 1969 (Scotland) Liberton
- 1968 (Scotland) Liberton
- 1967 (Scotland) Penicuik
- 1966 (Scotland) Edinburgh Northern
- 1965 (Scotland) Holy Cross
- 1964 (Scotland) Holy Cross
- 1963 (Scotland) Broughton
- 1962 (Scotland) Broughton
- 1961 (Scotland) Corstorphine
- 1960 (Scotland) Broughton
- 1959 (Scotland) Edinburgh Northern
- 1958 (Scotland) Edinburgh Northern
- 1957 (Scotland) Moray House
- 1956 (Scotland) County Rovers
- 1955 (Scotland) Edinburgh Northern

=== Women ===
- 2001 (Scotland) Edinburgh Academicals
- 2000 (Scotland) Murrayfield Wanderers
- 1999 (Scotland) Lismore

== See also ==
- Edinburgh Northern
- Scottish Rugby Union
