= Gary Armstrong (rugby union) =

British Lions & Scotland international rugby union player

- Born: 30 September 1966 (age 60) Edinburgh, Scotland
- Height: 5 ft 8 in (1.73 m)
- Weight: 90 kg (200 lb; 14 st 2 lb)

Rugby union career
- Position: Scrum-half
Amateur team(s)
Years	Team	Apps	(Points)
1987–95	Jed-Forest		
2018	Stewart's Melville		
2018	Penicuik		
Senior career
Years	Team	Apps	(Points)
1995–2002	Newcastle Falcons		
2002–04	Border Reivers		
Provincial / State sides
Years	Team	Apps	(Points)
1987-	South of Scotland District		
1988	Reds Trial		
International career
Years	Team	Apps	(Points)
- Scotland U16
- Scotland U18
- Scotland U21
1987-88	Scotland 'B'	2	(12)
1988–99	Scotland	51	(21)
1989	British and Irish Lions	0	(0)

Gary Armstrong OBE (born 30 September 1966, in Edinburgh) is a former Scotland international rugby union player. He played scrum-half for Jed-Forest RFC, Newcastle Falcons and the Border Reivers.

== Rugby Union career ==
=== Amateur career ===
He played for Jed-Forest. His nickname is the Border Terrier.

Gary Armstrong had succeeded a fellow British and Irish Lion and Scotland player, Roy Laidlaw, as scrum half at Jed-Forest. Armstrong was helped in his development as a youngster by Jedforest moving Laidlaw to stand off with Armstrong playing scrum half.

Jed-Forest rugby club honored Gary Armstrong and their other two famous scrum-halves, Roy Laidlaw and Greig Laidlaw, with a gala dinner on 2 August 2019. All three played for the British and Irish Lions and captained Scotland.

At the age of 51, his old Scotland team-mate Finlay Calder coaxed Armstrong into playing for Stewart's Melville 3rd team in a match against Penicuik 2nd team. Word got out that Armstrong was playing in the match; and Armstrong then played the 1st half with Stewarts Melville and the 2nd half with Penicuik.

=== Provincial and professional career ===
He played for South of Scotland District.

He played for the Reds Trial side in 1988, coming on as a substitute for Andrew Ker in the second half.

He joined Newcastle Falcons in 1995/96, and his appetite for the fray was seen to best advantage when the club won England's Allied Dunbar Premiership title in 1998, featuring in all 22 matches of the season. He also started the victorious 2001 Anglo-Welsh Cup final. Many supporters believe Armstrong to be the best player in the club's history. In Jonny Wilkinson's book How to Play Rugby My Way Armstrong is given the nickname–"the scrap-yard dog"– because Wilkinson said that he had never met anyone as "tough as him".

He was an ever-present in Newcastle Falcons 1998 Premiership win.

Armstrong finished his career by returning home to play for the newly created professional team, The Borders. He retired in 2004 at about the same time as Doddie Weir.

=== International career ===
He was capped by Scotland at age grades Under 16, Under 18 and Under 21.

He was capped twice by Scotland 'B' in 1987-8. He scored 3 tries against Italy 'B' in a 37–0 win for Scotland.

Armstrong made his full senior international debut in 1988, in a game against Australia building to their 1991 world cup victory. Armstrong displaced Laidlaw as the incumbent scrum half. Scotland lost 31–13 against one of Australia's best ever sides.

Richard Bath writes of him:

"...despite his apparently painful shyness, Armstrong has proved throughout his career to be obsessively focussed once out on the pitch. A relatively small man, Armstrong tackles way over his weight and combines this with quick service to his backs and an uncanny ability to break around the fringes just as easily from the first-phase as from ruck or maul. Although Armstrong failed to shine on the victorious 1989 Lions tour of Australia, his gritty nature stood him in good stead when the chips were down in 1990, that famous year for Scotland... he perhaps more than any other player was the on-field catalyst for Scotland's 13–7 win in the Grand Slam decider against the Auld Enemy England at Murrayfield."

It was Armstrong's dart to the blind side that provided the spark opening the opportunity leading to Tony Stanger's try.

He was scrum half in Scotland's 1990 Grand Slam win and his country's run to the 1991 rugby world cup semi final.

Armstrong's fearless commitment led to serious knee injuries in 1992 and 1994 that impacted the representative caps he collected. It spoke volumes for his tenacity and courage that he returned to the top flight.

In 1998 he captained the Scotland team again.

Armstrong equalled Roy Laidlaw’s then record as Scotland’s most capped scrum-half when he won his 47th cap against Romania in August 1999. He then joined the 50-cap club when he led Scotland to victory in the World Cup play-off match against Samoa that October.

Armstrong captained Scotland to victory in the 1999 Five Nations and to a quarter final place in the same year's rugby world cup.

Gary Armstrong captained Scotland to the 1999 Five Nations Championship, playing his eighth Test as captain as Scotland grasped pole position with their stunning 36–22 victory against France.

He was skipper throughout the previous two Five Nations Championships and was also captain on Scotland’s 1999 visit to South Africa, when he played in all four matches and scored the opening try of the tour in the victory over Border.

He retired from international rugby after Scotland’s 18–30 defeat by New Zealand in the 1999 Rugby World Cup quarter-final.

He played 51 times for Scotland.

In a 2015 series of articles in The Herald titled "The 50 Greatest Scottish Rugby Players", Armstrong was ranked as Scotland's greatest. Armstrong was known for intuitive awareness and was as much an auxiliary flanker and had uncanny talent to break around the fringes. As well as providing quick service as the connection between forwards and backs he was known for his toughness and tackling well above his weight. His fearlessness on the pitch led to two serious knee injuries keeping him out the game for lengthy spells.

==== Career statistics ====
International career: 51 caps. 1988 - A. 1989 - W E I F Fj R. 1990 - I F W E NZ1 NZ2 Arg. 1991 - F W E I R (WC) J I WS E NZ. 1993 - I F W E. 1994 - E I. 1996 - NZ1 NZ2 A. 1997 - W SA (rep). 1998 - It I F W E SA (rep). 1999 - W E I F Arg R WC (SA U Sam NZ).

Points: 21 (5 tries)

(Rewritten from the SRU website - used with permission)

== Awards and honours ==
He was appointed Officer of the Order of the British Empire (OBE) in the 2000 New Year Honours.
