= Ian Barnes (rugby union) =

Scotland international rugby union player

- Full name: Ian Andrew Barnes
- Born: Ian Andrew Barnes; 19 April 1948 (age 78) Hawick, Scotland
- Occupation: Retired

Rugby union career
- Position: Lock
Amateur team(s)
Years	Team	Apps	(Points)
-	Hawick Linden		
1965-67	Hawick	220	
1967-1978	Edinburgh University		
Provincial / State sides
Years	Team	Apps	(Points)
-	South of Scotland		
International career
Years	Team	Apps	(Points)
1971	Scotland 'B'	1	(0)
1972-77	Scotland	7	(0)
Coaching career
- Years: Team
- 1978-83: Edinburgh Academicals
- 1983-85: Hawick
- 1985-88: Stewart's Melville
- 1989-90: Hawick Linden
- 1990-93: Heriot's
- 1993-95: Haddington
- 1995-96: Trinity Academicals
- 1997-98: North Berwick
- 1998-2002: Hawick
- 2002-10: Edinburgh Academicals
- 1982-88: Edinburgh District Under-18s
- 1988-91: Edinburgh District
- 1991-94: Edinburgh District Under-21s
- 1994-97: Edinburgh District (Assistant)
- 1985-87: Scotland Under-19s
- 1987-91: Scotland Under-21s
- 1996: Scottish Students (Assistant)

Ian Barnes (born 19 April 1948) is a former Scotland international rugby union player.

== Rugby Union career ==
=== Amateur career ===
Barnes first played for Hawick Linden between 1965 and 1967.

He played 220 games for Hawick from between November 1967 and March 1978. He was ib the 'Unofficial' Scottish Championship winning teams in 1967-68 and 1971-72, and the teams which won the first five 'Official' Championships from 1973-74 through to 1977-78, losing only four out of the 55 league games played. He was captain of the Hawick side in 1975-76.

He also played one season for Edinburgh University in 1969-70.

=== Representative career ===
Debuted for South of Scotland District versus South Africa in a 3-3 draw at Netherdale in January 1979.

=== International career ===
Played in the first ever Scotland 'B' international against France in Oyannax in November 1971.

Made Scotland debut against Wales in Cardiff in February 1972.

Seven caps for Scotland and sat on the bench in the days before tactical substitutions 23 times, covering Gordon Brown and Alistair McHarg.

=== Coaching career ===
Head Coach of Edinburgh Academicals (1978-83).

Head Coach of Hawick (1983-85), winning Scottish championship in 1983-84.

Head Coach of Stewart's Melville (1985-88).

Head Coach of Hawick Linden (1989-90).

Head Coach of Heriot's (1990-93).

Head Coach of Haddington (1993-95).

Head Coach of Trinity Academicals (1995-96)

Head Coach of North Berwick (1997-98)

Head Coach of Hawick again (1998-2002), winning Scottish Championship in 2000-01 and 2001-02.

Head Coach of Edinburgh Accies again (2002-2010)

=== Representative coaching ===
Edinburgh Under-18s (1982-88)

Edinburgh (1988-91)

Edinburgh Under-21s (1991-94)

(Assistant) Edinburgh (1994-97)

Scotland Under-19s (1985-87)

Scotland Under-21s (1987-91)

Assistant coach for Scotland Students at 1996 Student World Cup

=== Administrative career ===
Elected to the Scottish Rugby Council in 2008-10.

== Journalistic career ==
He contributes articles to the internet rugby magazine site The Offside Line.

== Business career ==
Graduated LLB from Edinburgh University in 1969. Qualified as a Chartered Accountant in 1972.
