= Inverleith RFC =

Scottish rugby union club, based in Edinburgh

(Scotland) Inverleith RFC
- Full name: Inverleith Rugby Football Club
- Founded: 1996; 30 years ago
- Location: Edinburgh, Scotland
- Ground(s): Arboretum Row, Edinburgh
- League: East Division Three
- 2025–26: East Division Three (withdrawn)
Team kit

Official website
- inverleithrfc.org

Inverleith Rugby Football Club is a rugby union side currently playing in the East Division Three having been promoted in the season 2012–13. They play in Inverleith at Arboretum Row in the north of Edinburgh (adjacent to Inverleith Sports Ground, once the home of the Scotland national team) where their clubhouse and pitches are located on the corner of Arboretum and Ferry Road.

== History ==
The club has existed in its present form since 1996, when Holy Cross RFC and Ferranti RFC amalgamated but have been playing rugby on the site since the 1920s.

Inverleith have a rich touring tradition playing games home and away games against both Irish (Parkmore RFC) and French (Youkies RFC) teams mirroring the 6 nations schedule. Inverleith also send a team to the biennial Overton Rugby Festival in Hampshire and have enjoyed much success there, twice winning the plate. Most recently in May 2017 Inverleith embarked upon a tour to Madrid, playing Rugby Club Alcala.

Recently the club has had upgraded both their ground and changing facilities.

== Sides ==
The club has 1st XV, 2nd XV, and Over 35s sides.

Training takes place at the following times:-

Tuesday 18:30–20:00 Thursday 18:30–20:00

== Honours ==
- East Division 3
  - Champions (1): 2018-19
