= Jock's Lodge =

Area of Edinburgh, Scotland

Coordinates: 55°57′18.31″N 3°9′1.47″W

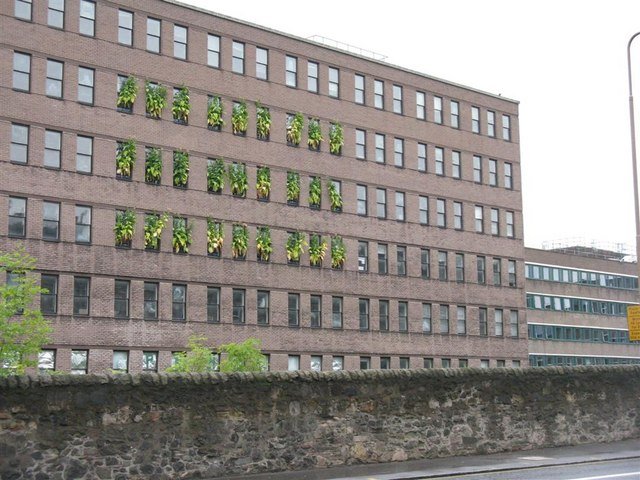
- The Tobacco House, by Ettie Spencer, was one of the many installations during the 2008 Edinburgh Art Festival

- Location within the City of Edinburgh council area Location within Scotland
- OS grid reference: NT283741
- Council area: City of Edinburgh
- Lieutenancy area: Edinburgh
- Country: Scotland
- Sovereign state: United Kingdom
- Post town: EDINBURGH
- Postcode district: EH8
- Dialling code: 0131
- Police: Scotland
- Fire: Scottish
- Ambulance: Scottish
- UK Parliament: Edinburgh East and Musselburgh
- Scottish Parliament: Edinburgh Eastern

Jock's Lodge is an area of Edinburgh, Scotland. It centres on the junction of London Road and Willowbrae Road (part of the A1 trunk route to London), Portobello Road and Restalrig Road South (Smokey Brae) and is an alternative name for the Meadowbank / Piershill area. Restalrig village lies to its north.

The name is mentioned, as Jokis Ludge, in John Nicoll's diary in 1650. A sasine in 1736 refers to "the Bleugowns Lodge commonly called Jocks Lodge". It is recorded that the Bluegowns, the king's bedesmen, were called by themselves and others Jockies. Thus the name of their house was Jockies Lodge.

The area is dominated by civil service office blocks, St Margaret's House and Meadowbank House, which were constructed in the early-1970s on the site of the St Margaret's railway locomotive depot, which was primarily for steam locomotives. From 2008, St Margaret's House has been leased to Edinburgh Palette, a registered charity which provides some 200 affordable studio spaces for designers, artists, small businesses and community organisations.

Meadowbank Stadium, immediately to the west was the location for the 1970 and 1986 Commonwealth Games. The East Coast Main Line railway also passes by here. Many of the houses in this area are Victorian tenements.

Both Royal HSFP and Lismore RFC were formerly based in the area; Lismore RFC taking its name from nearby Lismore Crescent.

Jock's Lodge was the first stop and change of the team horses for the original horse-drawn stagecoach run on the Edinburgh to London journey. At the back of the Jock Lodge Inn were the stables. This journey began at the White Horse Close in the Canongate, technically then just outside Edinburgh.
