= Earlston RFC =

Scottish rugby union club, based in Earlston, Scottish Borders

(Scotland) Earlston
- Full name: Earlston Rugby Football Club
- Union: Scottish Rugby Union
- Founded: 1870s
- Location: Earlston, Scotland
- Ground(s): The Haugh, Earlston
- League: East Division Two
- 2025–26: East Division Two, 3rd of 7
Team kit

Earlston RFC is a rugby union club, based at Earlston in the Scottish Borders (formerly Berwickshire).

Earlston is in the East Division Two of the East Regional League. It is the largest Scottish Borders club not to participate in the Border League.

It takes part in the Borders Sevens Circuit each May, which is the oldest tournament of its kind in the world. Rugby sevens were invented at Melrose nearby.

== Strip ==
Earlston RFC play in blue hoops on white shirts, navy shorts and red socks. The current kit is manufactured by Samurai. The shirt sponsor of the club are locally based solicitor and estate agent company 'Cullen Kilshaw'.

== History ==
No written records are available concerning the origins of the Club but it is believed that it was formed in the 1870s by two Yorkshiremen who were installing machinery in the local woollen mill. (The same men are supposed to have started the Langholm Club.) Kelso Rugby Club was formed in 1876 and one of their first games was against Earlston, the result being a draw. On 7 March 1879, Earlston played Kelso at Kelso in one of the first matches staged under electric floodlights.

The Club also played in the first Melrose Sevens in 1883. In the early years the Club's pitch was located at the Georgefield Road close to where the school pitches are today. In 1921 the present pitch at the Haugh (a Lowland Scots word meaning river meadow) was leased from A. Brownlie, Timber Merchants. Two years later the first Clubhouse was erected. On 1 September 1923 the first Earlston 7-a-side Tournament was held and in 1935 the present cup, reputed to be one of the most valuable on the Border Sevens circuit, was purchased thanks to subscriptions from Club supporters. In 1984 the Sevens date was switched to the Spring - the Sunday prior to the first Monday in May. The 1939 Sevens tournament was cancelled as World War 2 started the next day. No organised rugby took place until the war ended.

Throughout the war the pitch and clubhouse were requisitioned by the military. Approximately one third of the pitch was dug out and concrete laid to make "hull-down" park for tanks (Polish Lancers) stationed in the area preparing for D-Day. It was 1948 before the playing surface was full restored and matches were played on a temporary pitch on another part of the Haugh. From 1946 to 1948 the sevens were held at The Greenyards, Melrose – the Melrose Club refusing any offers of payment.

In 1968 the first major extension was carried out on the Clubhouse. The first licensed bar was installed at this time. In 1984–85 the Club President and Vice President (J. Fairbairn and R Kerr) held discussions with Mr A Brownlie Jnr., and the last named agreed to sell the pitch to the Club. A further major extension to the Clubhouse (the present layout) was completed in 1988.

== Earlston Sevens ==
Since 1923 the club host the annual Earlston Sevens tournament. This is part of the Kings of the Sevens championship.

== Honours ==
- Walkerburn Sevens
  - Champions (1): 1921
  - East league 3 champions 15/16
  - East league 3 champions 24/25
  - East bowl regional winners 24/25
  - Scottish national bowl champions 24/25

== External links and online refs ==
- Earlston RFC home site
