= Walkerburn Sevens =

Annual rugby sevens event

- Sport: Rugby sevens
- Instituted: 1911
- Number of teams: 16
- Country: Scotland
- Holders: (Scotland) Melrose Storm (2019)
- Most titles: (Scotland) Walkerburn (11 titles)
- Related competition: Kings of the Sevens

Walkerburn Sevens is an annual rugby sevens event held by Walkerburn RFC, in Walkerburn, Scotland. The Walkerburn Sevens was the sixth of the Border Sevens tournaments to be instated, in 1911, after the bigger events of the Border Sevens spring circuit.

The Walkerburn Sevens is traditionally the last tournament of the Sevens season. Although other Sevens events were to join the Borders Sevens Circuit later, the Walkerburn Sevens has kept its view as a finale from the other tournaments.

The other Borders Sevens tournaments combine in a Kings of the Sevens league; the Walkerburn tournament is called the Prince of the Sevens.

2019's Walkerburn Sevens will be played on 25 May.

== Sports Day ==
Walkerburn RFC introduced a Sports Day in 1911 featuring rugby sevens.

== Ballantyne Centenary Trophy ==
The winner of the Walkerburn Sevens receives the Jeremy Ballantyne Centenary Trophy.

The player of the tournament receives the Davie Campbell Cup. Davie Campbell was a former Walkerburn RFC convener and club stalwart.

== Invited Sides ==
Various sides have been invited to play in the Walkerburn Sevens tournament throughout the years. A touring team from Carlisle RFC was invited in 2010, along with the invitational charity side Pigbarians RFC The Army rugby union side was invited in 2005 and won the tournament.

== Sponsorship ==
The Sevens tournament is usually sponsored by Glendinning Groundworks as a main sponsor. The club however receives many sponsors; it boasted of a club record of 200 sponsors in 2015.

== Past winners ==
- 2023 (Scotland) Haddington
- 2022 (Scotland) Peebles
- 2021 no tournament – coronavirus pandemic
- 2020 no tournament – coronavirus pandemic
- 2019 (Scotland) Melrose Storm
- 2018 (Scotland) Melrose Storm
- 2017 (Scotland) Haddington
- 2016 (Scotland) Gala YM
- 2015 (Scotland) Gala YM
- 2014 (Scotland) Peebles
- 2013 (Scotland) Melrose 'A'
- 2012 (Scotland) Lasswade
- 2011 (Scotland) Edinburgh University
- 2010 (Scotland) Melrose 'A'
- 2009 (Scotland) Biggar
- 2008 (Scotland) Biggar
- 2007 (Scotland) Hawick 'A'
- 2006 (Scotland) Haddington
- 2005 (Scotland) Army
- 2004 (Scotland) Haddington
- 2003 (Scotland) Musselburgh
- 2002 (Scotland) Musselburgh
- 2001 (Scotland) St. Boswells
- 2000 (Scotland) Hawick 'A'
- 1999 (Scotland) Gala YM
- 1998 (Scotland) Hawick 'A'
- 1997 (Scotland) Preston Lodge
- 1996 (Scotland) Peebles
- 1995 (Scotland) Currie
- 1994 (Scotland) Currie
- 1993 (Scotland) Musselburgh
- 1992 (Scotland) Peebles
- 1991 (Scotland) Currie
- 1990 (Scotland) Musselburgh
- 1989 (Scotland) St. Boswells
- 1988 (Scotland) Gala YM
- 1987 (Scotland) Melrose 'A'
- 1986 (Scotland) Gala YM
- 1985 (Scotland) Hawick Trades
- 1984 (Scotland) Portobello
- 1983 (Scotland) Portobello
- 1982 (Scotland) Heriots
- 1981 (Scotland) Portobello
- 1980 (Scotland) Haddington
- 1979 (Scotland) Heriots
- 1978 (Scotland) Haddington
- 1977 (Scotland) Gala YM
- 1976 (Scotland) Haddington
- 1975 (Scotland) Melrose 'A'
- 1974 (Scotland) Portobello
- 1973 (Scotland) Gala YM
- 1972 (Scotland) Hawick YM
- 1971 (Scotland) Hawick YM
- 1970 (Scotland) Trinity Academicals
- 1969 (Scotland) Hawick Trades
- 1968 (Scotland) Trinity Academicals
- 1967 (Scotland) Trinity Academicals
- 1966 (Scotland) Walkerburn Select
- 1965 (Scotland) Trinity Academicals
- 1964 (Scotland) Hawick YM
- 1963 (Scotland) Hawick YM
- 1962 (Scotland) Hawick YM
- 1961 (Scotland) Trinity Academicals
- 1960 (Scotland) Musselburgh
- 1959 (Scotland) Watsonians
- 1958 (Scotland) Hawick YM
- 1957 (Scotland) Musselburgh
- 1956 (Scotland) Musselburgh
- 1955 (Scotland) Trinity Academicals
- 1954 (Scotland) Heriots
- 1953 (Scotland) Heriots
- 1952 (Scotland) Musselburgh
- 1951 (Scotland) Musselburgh
- 1950 (Scotland) Hawick Trades
- 1949 (Scotland) Boroughmuir
- 1948 (Scotland) Trinity Academicals
- 1947 (Scotland) Melrose 'A'
- 1942-1946 Second World War
- 1941 (Scotland) Watsonians
- 1940 (Scotland) Watsonians
- 1939 (Scotland) Watsonians
- 1938 (Scotland) Gala 'A'
- 1937 (Scotland) Edinburgh Borderers
- 1936 (Scotland) Walkerburn 'A'
- 1935 (Scotland) Gala Star
- 1934 (Scotland) Walkerburn
- 1933 (Scotland) Boroughmuir
- 1932 (Scotland) Melrose 'A'
- 1931 (Scotland) Boroughmuir
- 1930 (Scotland) Walkerburn
- 1929 (Scotland) Hawick YM
- 1928 (Scotland) Walkerburn
- 1927 (Scotland) Walkerburn
- 1926 (Scotland) Gala 'A'
- 1925 (Scotland) Walkerburn
- 1924 (Scotland) Gala 'A'
- 1923 (Scotland) Walkerburn 'A'
- 1922 (Scotland) Edinburgh Kenmore
- 1921 (Scotland) Earlston
- 1920 (Scotland) Hawick Albion
- 1915-1919 First World War
- 1914 (Scotland) Walkerburn 'A'
- 1913 (Scotland) Newington
- 1912 (Scotland) Walkerburn
- 1911 (Scotland) Walkerburn

'A' sides are shown where a club had entered two sides in the tournament

== See also ==
- Gala RFC
- Borders Sevens Circuit
- Scottish Rugby Union
