= Hearts and Balls =

Scottish charity

The Hearts and Balls Charitable Trust, sometimes stylized as Heart+Balls is a Scottish registered charity.

The charity was founded in 1999 following a spinal injury suffered by Struan Kerr-Liddell of the Lismore Rugby Club, and exists to support rugby players and their families in the aftermath of serious injury on the field.

As of 2022, Hearts+Balls had provided over £700,000 in aid.

== Rugby Sevens ==
They enter a men’s and women's sevens side into many Sevens tournaments around Scotland, England and Dubai. They usually denote the side as HBMB7 - or Hearts and Balls MB 7s.
