= Jim Aitken =

Scotland international rugby union player

- Born: James Aitken; 22 November 1947 (age 79) Penicuik, Midlothian, Scotland

Rugby union career
- Position: Prop
Amateur team(s)
Years	Team	Apps	(Points)
-	Penicuik		
–	Gala		
Provincial / State sides
Years	Team	Apps	(Points)
-	South of Scotland		
-	Scotland Probables		
International career
Years	Team	Apps	(Points)
1975-76	Scotland 'B'	2	
1977–84	Scotland	24	(4)

Jim Aitken (born 22 November 1947) is a British businessman and former Scotland international rugby union player. His regular playing position was Prop.

== Rugby Union career ==
=== Amateur career ===
Aitken played for his hometown club Penicuik, before moving to First Division Gala. He was the Gala Captain for their 3 League Championships in 1979/80, 80/81 and 82/83.

=== Provincial career ===
Aitken was capped by South of Scotland.

Aitken played for Scotland Probables in the Trial match against Scotland Possibles on 11 January 1975.

=== International career ===
Aitken was capped twice by Scotland 'B' - in 1975 and 1976 against France 'B' - before receiving a full senior cap.

Aitken won 24 international caps and scored one try, playing at loose head prop, between 1977 and 1984, and captained the Scottish Grand Slam side in the 1984 Five Nations Championship.

Aitken won his first cap for Scotland at the age of 29 against England in 1977, but was then replaced by the legendary two-time Lion, Ian McLauchlan, because of concerns about his scrummaging. After working hard on his technique, he returned in 1981 and played 21 of the next 24 tests. He captained Scotland to victory against England at Twickenham in 1983, Scotland's first win there since 1971. He played in Scotland's 25–25 draw against New Zealand, still the closest that Scotland have ever come to beating the All Blacks.

The following season, Scotland won the Grand Slam under his captaincy. During the tournament, he scored a try against Wales prior to the decisive final match against France, which Scotland won 21–12 to secure its first Grand Slam since 1925. He made one final international appearance against Romania before retiring from international rugby with a captaincy record of five wins, one draw, and one loss from seven matches. He has publicly criticized the administration and performance of Scottish rugby, describing it as "a mess" and directing specific criticism at former Scotland coaches Ian McGeechan and Jim Telfer.

== Business career ==
Aitken underachieved at High School but graduated from Edinburgh College of Commerce. He is now a successful businessman, owning one of Scotland's largest grain merchants and having sold his previous company, Scotmalt, in 2003. In 2009, he donated £100,000 to the Conservative Party, becoming the second-largest donor to the Scottish branch of the party.
