= Mains Park =

Sports venue in Linlithgow, Scotland

- Location: Mains Road, Linlithgow, West Lothian, Scotland
- Coordinates: 55°58′23″N 3°37′18″W
- Opened: 1940

Mains Park is a rugby ground and a former greyhound racing track on Mains Road, Linlithgow, West Lothian, Scotland.

Mains Park has been the home ground of Linlithgow RFC since 1982 and in 1992 the club took possession of both pitches on Mains Park after the local football team vacated the lower pitch.

Greyhound racing started in Mains Park on 1 April 1940 and was independent (unaffiliated to a governing body). The track was situated on the lower pitch next to the Cellar Road footpath. The exact date of closure is unknown but it was still active in 1950 after inclusion in the betting licence lists.
