= Grahame Budge =

British Isles & Scotland international rugby union player

- Born: Grahame Morris Budge; 7 November 1920 Hamiota, Manitoba
- Died: 14 November 1979 (aged 59) Vancouver, British Columbia, Canada

Rugby union career
Amateur team(s)
Years	Team	Apps	(Points)
193?-194?	Dunbar RFC		
–	Edinburgh Wanderers		
–	BC Bears		
International career
Years	Team	Apps	(Points)
	Scotland	4	
1950	British Lions	1	

Grahame Morris Budge (7 November 1920 – 14 November 1979) was a Scotland rugby player. He played four times for Scotland and once for the British Isles against New Zealand.

== Career ==
He played for various clubs, which included Dunbar RFC, where the club's historian, from a later generation, would record him as being a local lad who played for Dunbar RFC both before and after the Second World War before moving on to play for Edinburgh Wanderers, later still Scotland and finally he was called up for the British Lions in the same year as for Scotland, in 1950.

This tour was notable for being the first of the British and Irish Lions tours to occur after The Second World War (the previous tour was in 1938) and the first in which the British and Irish visitors wore red. For around 30 years the standard shirt was a now relatively unfamiliar but then famous navy blue design.

Budge was not unique in being an individual who played for a Canadian club and the Lions. As an aside, in his case at one point he played for the British Columbia Bears, sometimes known as the BC Bears. Rather, three other players also fulfill this criterion. None of these men played for Wales or Ireland, but two played for Scotland at international level and the other two for England, before they all played for the Lions.

Budge was unique, however, in having played for the Lions and having been born in Canada.

== Family ==
His granddaughter, Alison Christie, played 61 times for Scotland between 1994 and 2004
