= Gordon Connell =

Gordon Connell may refer to:

- Gordon Connell (actor) (1923–2016), American musical theatre and television actor
- Gordon Connell (rugby union) (born 1944), former Scotland international rugby union player
