= Liberton RFC =

Scottish rugby union club, based in Edinburgh

(Scotland) Liberton RFC
- Full name: Liberton Rugby Football Club
- Founded: 1963; 63 years ago
- Location: Edinburgh, Scotland
- Ground: Double Hedges Park
- League(s): Men: East Non-League; Women: Scottish Women's Non-League
- 2024–25: Men: East Non-League; Women: Scottish Women's Midlands & East One
Team kit

Official website
- www.libertonrfc.com

Liberton RFC is a rugby union club based in Edinburgh, Scotland. The Men's team currently plays in East Non-League, the former Women's team which was controversially disbanded in 2023 played in Scottish Women's Non-League.

== History ==
The club was formed in 1963 by former pupils of Liberton High School in Edinburgh.

In 2016, the club formed a women's side. In 2023, the club controversially disbanded the women's team, stating it could not manage their 'additional needs'. This came against the backdrop of accusations of homophobia, misogyny and racism by members of the club committee towards female players and members of the club.

== Sides ==
The club runs a men's side. Training on Tuesday and Thursday nights from 7pm to 8.30pm. Matches are played on a Saturday.

During the summer the guys will be playing touch at Double Hedges

== Honours ==
=== Men's ===
- Edinburgh and District league
  - Champions (1): 1974-75
- Edinburgh Northern Sevens
  - Champions (6): 1968, 1969, 1971, 1972, 1973, 1975
- I.C.I. Sevens
  - Champions (1): 1971
- East Region Bowl
  - Winners (1) 2013

== Notable former players ==
=== Men ===
==== Scotland ====
The following former Liberton RFC players have represented Scotland.

- (Scotland) Bruce Hay
