= Bruce Hay =

Scotland international rugby union player

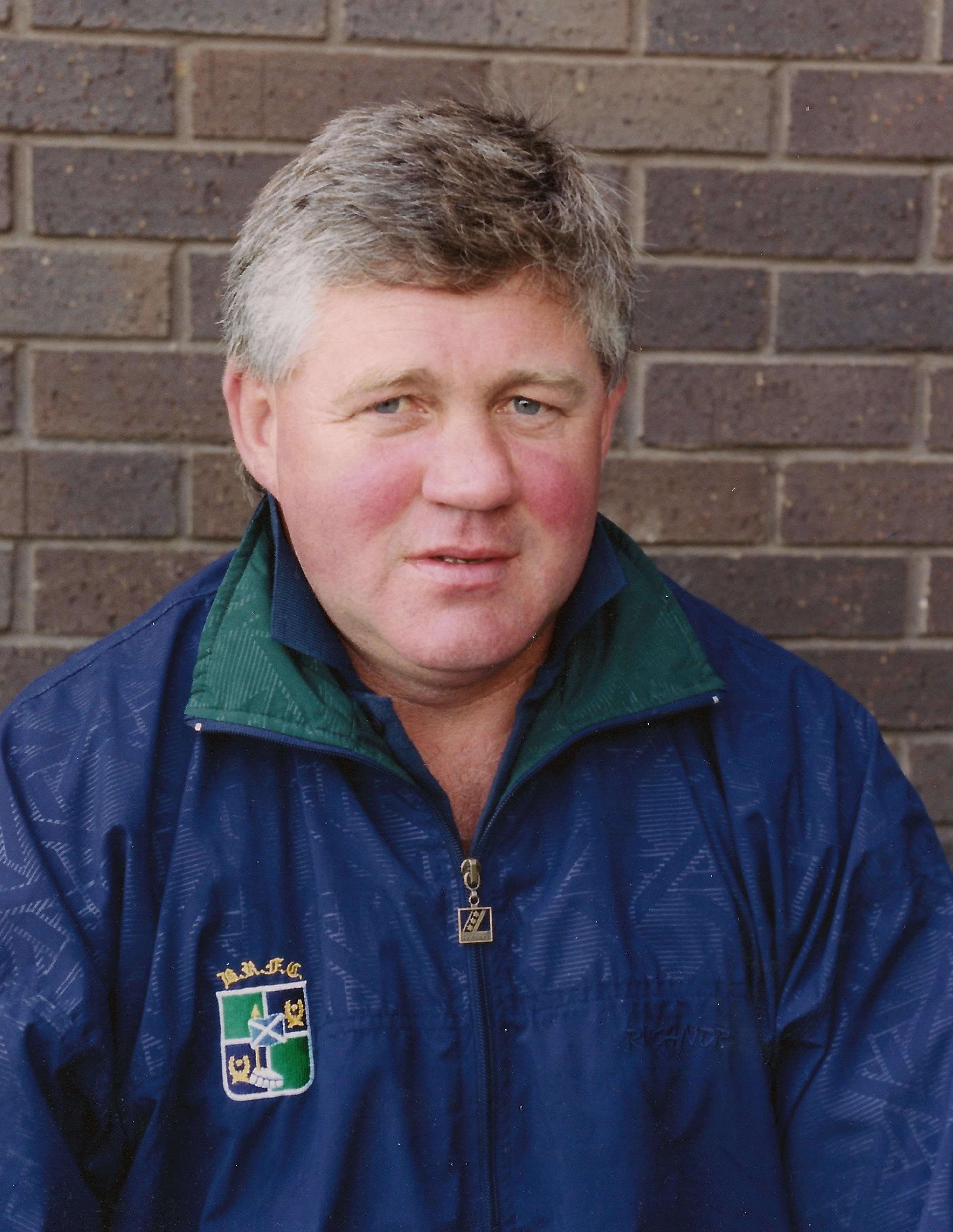
- Born: Bruce Hamilton Hay; 23 May 1950 Edinburgh, Scotland
- Died: 1 October 2007 (aged 57) Edinburgh, Scotland

Rugby union career
- Position: full-back
Amateur team(s)
Years	Team	Apps	(Points)
–	Liberton		
1972–	Boroughmuir	279	
Provincial / State sides
Years	Team	Apps	(Points)
–	Edinburgh District		
International career
Years	Team	Apps	(Points)
1975-81	Scotland	23	(12)
Coaching career
- Years: Team
- –: Boroughmuir
- –: Edinburgh
- –: Scotland B
- –: Scotland Under-19s

Bruce Hamilton Hay (23 May 1950 – 1 October 2007) was a Scotland international rugby union player.

== Background ==
Hay was born in Edinburgh and educated at Liberton High School. From there he went on to work as an electrical engineer for the National Coal Board. Latterly he worked as a sales representative.

== Rugby Union career ==
=== Amateur career ===
Hay was a fullback. He started his rugby career at junior club Liberton, a team he captained at the age of 18, He then moved to play for Boroughmuir.

He helped Boroughmuir win the Scottish Unofficial Championship in 1973; and was still in their side when they won the Melrose Sevens in 1976.

=== Provincial career ===
While still at Liberton he was capped by Edinburgh District. This was an astonishing feat for a junior club player and his tough tackling reputation was sealed. He carried on representing the district when he moved to Boroughmuir.

=== International career ===
It was when Hay moved to Boroughmuir in 1972 that he went on to gain international recognition.

He gained 23 international caps for Scotland and also represented the British and Irish Lions on both their 1977 and 1980 tours, and the Barbarians.

==== Stats ====
- International debut: 14 June 1975 v New Zealand in Auckland. Lost 24-0
- Final appearance: 20 June 1981 v New Zealand in Auckland. Lost 40-15
- Scotland: Caps: 23. Tries: 3
- Lions Tests: 3 (on 1980 South Africa tour). Tries: 1 (v South Africa)

== Death ==
He was diagnosed with a brain tumour in 2005 and died on 1 October 2007, aged 57.
