= Edinburgh University Medics RFC =

Scottish rugby union club, based in Edinburgh

(Scotland) Edinburgh University Medics RFC
- Full name: Edinburgh University Medics Rugby Football Club
- Location: Edinburgh, Scotland
- Ground(s): Peffermill pitches, Edinburgh
- League: East Division Three
- 2025–26: East Division Three, 5th of 7
Team kit

Official website
- www.pitchero.com/clubs/edinburghuniversitymedicsrfc

Edinburgh University Medics RFC is a rugby union club based in Edinburgh, Scotland. The Men's team currently plays in East Division Three.

== History ==
The distinctive colours of the club - red, maroon and yellow - are said to represent blood, liver and pus, befitting a team of medics.

The side won the Scottish and Northern Irish Medics Sports, which was hosted in Edinburgh at Inch Park on 2 November 2019.

The club’s most successful day was in 2023 when they were crowned Bowl champions of the east region. The final was played against Hawick Harlequins, a side who were two leagues above. Despite the Hawick side’s large pack, EUMRFC managed to hold out for an impressive 18-12 victory, allowing then skipper Francis Branford to lift the trophy before retiring from the role to pursue a career in teaching.

== Honours ==
- Tennents East Division 3 Bowl champions 2022-23
- SNIMS
  - Champions (2): 2019-20, 2025-2026

== Notable former players ==
=== Scotland ===
The following former Edinburgh University Medics players have represented Scotland at international level.

- (Scotland) Geoff Cross
