= Edinburgh Northern RFC =

Scottish rugby union club, based in Edinburgh

(Scotland) Edinburgh Northern
- Full name: Edinburgh Northern Rugby Football Club
- Union: Scottish Rugby Union
- Nickname: Northern
- Founded: 1920
- Location: Edinburgh, Scotland
- Ground(s): Inverleith Park, Edinburgh
- President: John Leatham
- Coach: Jamie McCann
- Captain: Crebhan Hughes
- League: East Division 3
- 2024–25: East Division 3, 3rd of 8
Team kit

Official website
- www.enrfc.co.uk

Edinburgh Northern Rugby Football Club is a rugby union club in the Scottish Rugby Union, located at Inverleith Park, by Stockbridge and Fettes in the centre of Edinburgh, playing in the East Division 3 league.

== History ==
Founded in 1920, the club's playing colours are Navy Blue and Old Gold.

The Club regularly fields two XVs in competitive regional leagues and also has an additional 'Over 35s' team, the Gentlemen of Northern, for players who wish to continue playing in their later years.

The 1st XV and 2nd XV train each Tuesday and Thursday evening in Inverleith Park at 18:30.

== Edinburgh Northern Sevens ==
Northern host one of the city's largest annual Sevens tournaments every April, which attracts entrants from all over the UK and hold an excellent reputation as a host for touring clubs from all Great Britain, Ireland and Europe visiting Edinburgh.

== Honours ==
- Edinburgh Northern Sevens
  - Champions: (4) 1955, 1958, 1959, 1966
- Edinburgh District Sevens
  - Champions: (1) 1957
- East Regional Bowl
  - Champions: (1) 2024
- East Reserve Division 2 (2nd XV)
  - Champions: (1) 2024-25
