= Linlithgow RFC =

Scottish rugby union club, based in Linlithgow, West Lothian

(Scotland) Linlithgow RFC
- Full name: Linlithgow Rugby Football Club
- Union: Scottish Rugby Union
- Founded: 1970; 56 years ago
- Location: Linlithgow, Scotland
- League: Scottish National League Division Four
- 2025–26: Scottish National League Division Four, 4th of 9
Team kit

Linlithgow Rugby Football Club are an amateur Scottish Rugby Union side currently playing in East Regional League Division One.

== History ==
The club as it is today was founded in 1970. Linlithgow RFC play their home matches at Mains Park in Linlithgow.

== Linlithgow Sevens ==
The club started its own Sevens tournament in 2024. Styled as Redsfest it features the Sevens tournament, beers and live music. The club won its own tournament for the first time in 2025.

== Honours ==
- Linlithgow Sevens
  - Champions (1): 2025
- Portobello Sevens
  - Champions: 2022
- Hillfoots Sevens
  - Champions: 1984, 1987
- Lismore Sevens
  - Champions: 1988
- Penicuik Sevens
  - Champions: 1992
- Holy Cross Sevens
  - Champions: 1994
- Edinburgh Northern Sevens
  - Champions: 1984, 1985, 1987
