= St Boswells RFC =

Scottish rugby union team

(Scotland) St Boswells RFC
- Founded: 1926; 100 years ago
- League: East Non-League
- 2024–25: East Non-League
Team kit

Official website
- [ www.walkerburnrugby.org.uk%20www.walkerburnrugby.org.uk]]

St. Boswells Rugby Football Club are a rugby union side in the small village of St Boswells in the Borders, Scotland.

== History ==
Founded in 1926; it closed in 1932–33; the club went into liquidation at the start of World War 2; and was revived after the War in 1946.

Its birth in 1926 was reported by the Southern Reporter newspaper of 26 August 1926:

Border devotees of the robust game of rugby are keenly interested in the new club which has been formed at St Boswells. and are hoping that will meet with success. Those who are behind it are out and out enthusiasts; and they have been getting a move on. The committee responsible for the season's arrangements have already fixed over a dozen matches, with the expectation few more. The Earl of Dalkeith has been elected president; subject to his consent; while the captain Mr J. M. Smith of Thornielaw and the vice-captain Mr Allan Mitchell. The Club are indebted Messrs A. and J. B. Turnbull of Kelso for the gift of goalposts, for which the members have expressed gratitude; and Mr. Fairbairn has granted the use a field, with an entrance off "Jenny Moore's Lane." On Monday the captain gave an interesting address on training, and we hope the players will take his words to heart, as there no "royal road" in this sport. To the St. Boswells ruggerites: Success!

They currently play in the Scottish National League Division Three.

St. Boswells had a run of 56 matches without defeat from 2012 to 2013 season; they won the BT Shield in 2015.

== Sevens tournament ==
The club run the St. Boswells Sevens tournament.

== Honours ==
- Hawick Linden Sevens
  - Champions (1): 2014
- BT Shield
  - Champions (1): 2014-15
- Ellon Sevens
  - Champions: 1983, 1991, 1992
- Panmure Sevens
  - Champions: 1988
- Selkirk Junior Sevens
  - Champions: 1988
- Gala Y.M. Sevens
  - Champions: 1985
- Langholm Junior Sevens
  - Champions: 1987
- Holy Cross Sevens
  - Champions: 1985
- Walkerburn Sevens
  - Champions: 2001
- North Berwick Sevens
  - Champions: 1986, 1987, 1988
