= Portobello RFC =

Scottish rugby union club, based in Edinburgh

(Scotland) Portobello RFC
- Full name: Portobello Rugby Football Club
- Nickname: Porty
- Ground(s): Cavalry Park, Duddingston, Edinburgh
- League: East Division One
- 2025–26: East Division One, 6th of 8
Team kit

Official website
- www.pitchero.com/clubs/portobellofp/

Portobello RFC, formerly known as Portobello FP, is a rugby union side based in Edinburgh, Scotland.

The first XV currently play in East Division One. Their 2nd XV play in the East Reserve League 2.

== History ==
Portobello was founded as a former pupils club of Portobello High School, once one of the largest schools in Europe. It is no longer purely a haven for former pupils and welcomes players from all over the rugby world. They play at Cavalry Park, in Duddingston, Edinburgh.

The club was reformed in 1954 and enjoyed fixtures against the elite of the established "circuit". Portobello tried for many years to climb out of the old Edinburgh District League achieving that in the 1970s climbing through Divisions 7 to 2 in successive seasons.

As recently as 2007, the club struggled, with playing membership down and results on the field less than inspiring. Rather bizarrely, the event that acted as a catalyst for improvement was a fire which decimated the clubhouse in May of that year. The fire brought friends, members and players (current and past) together to rebuild the club.

The subsequent season saw a significant upturn in the playing fortunes with 1st and 2nd XV both turning in more than respectable performances. The icing on the cake was a glorious cup run culminating in an appearance in the National Plate final at Murray field on 3 May 2008.

The 2008–09 season saw the 1st XV finishing runners up in their league while the 2nd XV finished top of the tree in their respective division. In 2009–10 the top team were once again pipped for the title by North Berwick and the SXY2S finished 3rd in their respective league.

The club also runs a Youth Section with teams at all Micro (Primary 1 and Primary 2), Mini (Primary 3 – Primary 7), Midi (S1 up to under-16) and Colts (under-18) levels.

The Gaelic football team, Dúnedin Connolly GAC currently share their ground.

== Portobello Sevens ==
The club run the Portobello Sevens tournament.

== Honours ==
- Portobello Sevens
  - Champions: 1983, 1984, 1990
- Edinburgh and Lothian U-16
  - Champions: 1993
  - Runners up: 1992
- Peebles Sevens
  - Champions: 1987, 1990
- Walkerburn Sevens
  - Champions : 1974, 1981, 1983, 1984
- Livingston Sevens
  - Champions: 1974, 1978, 1979, 1981
- Grangemouth Sevens
  - Champions: 1983
- Gala Y.M. Sevens
  - Champions: 1973
- Royal HSFP Sevens
  - Champions: 1984, 1986, 1987
- Preston Lodge Sevens
  - Champions: 1986
- Broughton Sevens
  - Champions: 2009
- Alloa Sevens
  - Champions: 1974, 1975, 1976, 1977
- Lismore Sevens
  - Champions: 1978
- Holy Cross Sevens
  - Champions: 1995
- Glenrothes Sevens
  - Champions: 1980
- Haddington Sevens
  - Champions: 1982, 1984, 1985
- Edinburgh Northern Sevens
  - Champions: 1970
- Edinburgh District Sevens
  - Champions: 1973, 1974, 1983
- Musselburgh Sevens
  - Champions: 1984
- North Berwick Sevens
  - Champions: 1979
- Old Augustinians Sevens
  - Champions: 1980

== Notable former players ==
=== Glasgow Warriors players ===
- (Scotland) Hamish Bain
