= Biggar RFC =

Scottish rugby union club, based in Biggar

Biggar
- Full name: Biggar Rugby Football Club
- Union: SRU
- Founded: 1975; 50 years ago
- Location: Biggar, Scotland
- Ground(s): Hartree Mill
- President: Rab Ramsay
- Coach(es): David Wilson/Dougie Fleming
- Captain(s): Andrew Jardine Emelia Knights
- League(s): Men: Scottish National League Division One; Women: Scottish Womens Premiership
- 2024–25: Men: Scottish National League Division One, 4th of 10; Women: Scottish Womens West One 1st & CH (promoted)
Team kit

Official website
- biggarrfc.org.uk

Biggar RFC is a rugby union club based in Biggar, South Lanarkshire, Scotland. Founded in 1975, the team plays its home games at Hartree Mill. The men's side currently competes in Scottish National League Division One, the women's side currently compete in Scottish Womens Premiership.

== History ==
The club was formed in 1975 by five men who had been heavily involved in rugby clubs in their younger days and thought that the area might sustain a new social rugby club. These were Dr. Mike Bewsher (Melrose), Richard Carr (Harlequins), Les Clerihew (Stewarts College), Archie Stott (Hawick Trades) and Tom Wight (Melrose).

Twenty-eight years later, at the end of season 2003–04, the club found itself promoted to the top division in Scotland for season 2004–05. In the 2005–06 season, the club finished 5th in the Scottish Premiership. In their second season, they slipped to relegation. In 2012–13 season the club finished 8th in the National League, the second tier of club rugby, after a late season run of good results.

The club happened to be in the Edinburgh District set up but is not in Edinburgh. On the fringes of the Scottish Borders, it is in South Lanarkshire.

Biggar built its own clubhouse premises in 1989 (extended in 2012) and now owns some 30 acres (120,000 m^{2}) of ground. The club recently developed its playing facilities and now has 5 pitches, 4 of which are floodlit. The Club's facilities are used by Biggar Football Club and Biggar Athletics club (a satellite of Law Athletics Club)

Biggar's most notable player is Scott Lawson. The hooker played for Biggar before going on to gain 46 Scotland caps at full international level.

The club currently has 250 School aged members.

== Biggar Sevens ==
The club run the Biggar Sevens tournament.

== Honours ==
- Peebles Sevens
  - Champions (2): 1993, 1995
- Walkerburn Sevens
  - Champions (2): 2008, 2009
- Arran Sevens
  - Champions (1): 2008
- Glasgow Warriors Community Club of the Season
  - Champions (1): 2019-20

== Notable players ==
Two other internationalists are Fraser Brown with 61 caps for Scotland Men and Donna Kennedy for Scotland Women who still holds the record as being most capped Scotland international (115 caps).
