= Parkmore RFC =

Irish rugby union football club

- Union: IRFU; Leinster
- Founded: 1907
- Ground(s): Lakelands Park, Dublin
- President: William Lalor
- Captain: Mick Costelloe
- League: Leinster Metro League
Team kit

Parkmore RFC is an Irish rugby team based in Terenure, Dublin. They play in the Leinster Metro League.

The club colours are sky blue and white hoops.

The club was founded in the 1907–08 season as the Carlisle club, based near Parkmore drive in Dublin 6W. A hundred years on, the club had its name changed and they moved to Terenure RFC grounds.

At the moment they have two teams, a first XV and an occasional second team for friendlies.

== History ==
=== Beginnings at Parkmore Drive: 1907–1945 ===
Carlisle RFC can trace its history back to the 1907–1908 season. At that time a team drawn from Dublin's Jewish Community, captained by I. Wigoder played a number of games under the name Carlisle RFC. It was so called because similar to the Cricket Club, a number of the founding members lived in Carlisle Street.

During 1908 to 1910 Bethel Solomons was capped ten times at Senior International Level for Ireland. The First World War disrupted the club's activities and it re-appears in 1926, sometimes referred to as the "Dublin Jewish Rugby XV". However, in 1927 the club was formally re-established and affiliated to the IRFU as Carlisle RFC. The man behind this development was Maurice Stein, who was elected captain. Most of the team had never played Rugby before, but they did bring considerable boxing experience with them. Games were played at Parkmore Drive on most Sundays. By 1939 two teams were fielded. It was recalled that Maurice Stein and brother Stanley would bring to every game at least six sets of spare togs so that any team defections could be filled from unsuspecting spectators.

Leslie Silverstone who joined in 1938 was still playing for Carlisle 26 years later – a unique record.

The club continued in full swing during 1940/41, but playing strength was significantly reduced by emigration and, of course, the outbreak of World War II.

=== Move from Parkmore Drive: 1945–1960 ===
The club was reborn in 1945, after the war, and some of the notable players were: Billy Cornick, Ucky Fine, Norman “Doc” Jackson, Sammy Danker, Arnold “Scottie” White, Arthur Barling, Malcolm Glass and Jack Bloom. Bloom captained the team 1946–47 in the minor league, and a successful section was managed by Dr. N. Jackson. In 1948 Arthur Barling was elected chairman, an office he was to hold many times, and Leslie Silverstone captained the side when the Jewish Leeds Institute paid their first visit to Dublin.

The club vacated Parkmore Drive in 1950 and after a brief spell on an adjoining field, played home games at Sandford Park School, Ranelagh. A highlight of 1951 was when Okie Geffin, one of South Africa’s finest rugby players, attended a special dinner held in his honour.

Prior to the new grounds opening at Kimmage, Ernie Harrison captained the team through a difficult season. In 1954, at long last the Kimmage Sports Complex was opened and Mervyn Hool had the privilege of leading the team on to the new pitch. The first official game at the grounds in Kimmage was against Des Hennessey's XV drawn mainly from Palmerston RFC. The club was fortunate to have as its secretary the patient, diplomatic John Finkel.

There were many retirees during the fifties, such as Ernie and Dave Harrison, Jack Bloom, Ellis Freedman and Dr. Syd Sugarman.

The late Syd Sugerman was for many years medical officer for the Wallabies, the A.R.F.S.U. and N.S.W. Schools Rugby Union rugby teams. Sugerman was Honorary Doctor to the senior Australian team on its tour to Argentina in 1979 and was joint medical advisor to the ARFU and team honorary doctor in 1983 and 1984. In 1984 he was with the team in Fiji and later that year in the UK and Ireland when they won the Grand Slam. He was also honorary medical adviser to the Australian Rugby Football Schools Union from 1980 to 1984. He was particularly well known as a supporter and medical specialist to various groups and teams of schoolboys in the Sydney area. He died on 12/1/1985. After his death the Committee of the ARFSU unanimously agreed to honour Sugerman's contribution to schoolboys rugby by making this award to a member of each team at the Championships.

=== The glorious years: 1960–1980 ===
Intervisits continued towards the end of the decade with Brian Ellis as captain. The early sixties proved to be a lean time for the rugby section but thanks to the endeavours of Berk Citron and Ucky Fine, members were gathered from other rugby teams and a whole new generation came into being.

This new era carried into the seventies when George Hook took over as coach. Carlisle RFC reached the Spencer Cup final twice and Moran Cup Semi-Final testimony to Georges coaching skill which was subsequently demonstrated with Connacht and the American Eagles among others. The 1927–73 team was: D. Jacobson, L Handleman, EJ Deering, B. White, B. Caldwell, F. McDermot, B. Jacobson, A. Davidson, A. Dargan, A Obernik (Capt), M. Bloom, B. Winn, J. Caplin, J. Phillips, W. Grodkin, M. Samuels, C. Wojnar,B Wojnar, N. Carey – at that time David White chaired a hard working committee and received plenty of support from PS White, Max Fine, Robert White, Arnold Lewis, Bernard White.

Stuart Barling, a long-standing player, became a senior referee, the only Carlisle member to do so.

In 1978 a disagreement over club policy led to a most unfortunate split within the rugby section resulting in the loss of several “seasoned” players. Some older members rallied around but playing strength was reduced. Some younger players were brought in such as Niall and Jeremy Jacobs, Eddie Elliman, Alan Traub, Paul Jacobs, Robert Glass, Tevian Mirrelson and Keith Davies.

Tragedy struck in 1979 when Kenny Harris (captain) sustained a serious neck injury that ultimately left him paralysed.

=== New Parkmore RFC: 1980–today ===
Finally in 1989 the club ended its direct affiliation with Dublin Maccabi and was renamed Parkmore RFC; however, they did remain as tenants in the grounds of Kimmage Road West until it was sold in 1999. Since then, Parkmore RFC have thrived and recently won their first two titles: the J4 Leinster Section C League in 2012 and Leinster Junior Division Champions in 2015, the two first notable win in 105 years of the Carlisle / Parkmore teams playing rugby.
