= Dunbar RFC =

Scottish rugby union club, based in Dunbar

(Scotland) Dunbar Rugby Football Club
- Union: Scottish Rugby
- Founded: 1923; 103 years ago
- Location: Dunbar
- Region: East Lothian
- Ground: Hallhill Healthy Living Centre
- President: Kerrie Knox
- Coach: Damian Jones (Head Coach) Thomas Salkeld (Attack Coach)
- Captain: Callum Harding
- League: East Division One
- 2025–26: East Division One, 2nd of 8
Team kit

Official website
- dunbarrugbyclub.com

Dunbar RFC is an amateur rugby club based in Dunbar, East Lothian. Founded in 1923 they play their home games at Hallhill Healthy Living Centre, where they moved to in 2001. They compete in the East Regional League Division One.

== History ==
The club was founded by a group of commuters on the Dunbar-to-Edinburgh train. They set up a meeting on 16 November 1923 to formally announce the formation of the club, the first president (Dr. McLagan), and the captain (J.C. McCubbin).

== Seasons ==
=== 2025/26 ===
Dunbar RFC compete in the Arnold Clark East Region Division 1 with 8 other teams, having been promoted from East region 2 as champions. Dunbar RFC won the league by a 22 points (65 points) over the closest competitors Livingston RFC (43 points). Dunbar RFC won 13 games scoring 723 points and conceding only 193 points in 14 games.

The team also secured victory in the plate final of the North Berwick 7s held on 19th April 2025.

== Famous players ==
- Grahame Budge – Scotland & British Lions 1950 – the first tour played in what became the red jersey
- Derek White – Dunbar, Haddington, Gala, Scotland, British Lions

== Players ==
- Front Row – Ross Thomson, Euan MacRury, Luke Miller, Aiden Paterson, Dylan Sammels, Matthew Mackay, Struan Lugton, Alan McConnachie, Jack Gabbatiss, Richie Gallacher, Aiden McNelis
- Second Row – Josh Graham, Ewan Miller, Daniel Philp, Calum Ross, Ben Miller, Chris Bryce, Callum Higginbottom, Rory Anderson, Michael McDermott
- Back Row – Calum Harding (c), Lochie Milne, Ewan Patrizio, Daniel Martin, Rowan Armatage
- Scrum Half – Gregor Ronan, Jamie Nicolson, Isaac Anderson
- Fly Half – Kyle Gallacher, Blair Mills, Ross Charlton
- Centres – Mickey Hall, Robbie Logan, Calum McCullough, Joe Townshend,
- Wingers – John Peebles, Rory Dowding, Sandy Graham
- Full Back – Robbie Cockburn, Finlay Milne

== School of rugby and mini rugby ==
Dunbar Rugby Football Club runs mini rugby sessions for young children, primarily at Hallhill Sports Centre in Dunbar, Mini rugby is typically for Primary 1 through Primary 7 (P1–P7) age groups.

The Dunbar RFC's annual minis rugby tournament held each spring at the Hallhill Sports Centre.

In partnership with Dunbar Grammar School, the club provide youth rugby for U13, U14, U15, U16 and U18 teams, these teams compete in the East Youth Schools conference and Schools Cup competitions. They have had some recent success in the Cup competition, winning the U16 Shield in 2019 and the U16 Plate in 2023.

In recent years the club have set up a girls section with over 30 girls from Dunbar and surrounding area training and playing at U12, U14 & U16.

== Sponsors ==
- Senior rugby - Belhaven Brewery {
- Girls rugby - Taylor Wimpey
- Youth rugby - AEGON Asset Management
- Mini rugby - Wigwam Holidays Cove Farm
