= Broughton RFC (Edinburgh) =

Scottish rugby union club, based in Edinburgh

(Scotland) Broughton RFC
- Full name: Broughton Rugby Football Club
- Founded: 1924
- Location: Edinburgh, Scotland
- Ground: Wardie Playing Fields
- League(s): Men: East Division Two; Women: Scottish Women's Midlands & East One
- 2025–26: Men: East Division One (withdrawn); Women: Scottish Women's Midlands & East One, 2nd of 6
Team kit

Official website
- www.broughtonrugby.co.uk

Broughton RFC is a rugby union club based in Edinburgh, Scotland. The Men's team currently plays in East Division Two; the Women's team currently plays in Scottish Women's Midlands & East One.

== History ==
The club was founded in 1924. The club was started by former pupils of Broughton School in Edinburgh, and the club was initially named Broughton F.P. RFC. The Edinburgh Evening News of 19 September 1924 reporting:

A F.P. rugby club has been started in connection with Broughton Secondary School, and fixtures are being arranged for two XVs. It is expected that the pitch will be available for home matches at Wardie. A cordial invitation to join is extended to all F.P.s and a meeting will held in the school on Monday first, at 7.30. Any honorary secretaries having vacant dates are invited to communicate with Mr Bauchope at the school.

Rugby at Broughton School was in a healthy position, particularly in comparison with association football. The Broughton F.P. name was also used by the analogous association football side. They had a longstanding connection with the Lothian Amateurs side but, on 2 October 1924, they had to break that connection as they could not get enough association football players from the school ranks; noting that the Broughton School's standard code was rugby union.

The rugby club's first match was on 24 October 1924. They played Linlithgow and were beaten 8–0; all of Linlithgow's points coming in the first half.

The women's team was started in 2009.

== Sides ==
The club runs a men's and women's side. Both train on Tuesday and Thursday nights from 7pm at Wardie.

== Sevens tournament ==
The club runs the Broughton Sevens.

== Honours ==
=== Men's ===
- East Regional Bowl
  - Champions (1): 2013
- Haddington Sevens
  - Champions (4): 1932, 1937, 1938, 1948
- Edinburgh Northern Sevens
  - Champions (3): 1960, 1962, 1963
- Kirkcaldy Sevens
  - Champions (1): 1966
- Stirling Sevens
  - Champions (1): 1967
- Corstorphine Athletics Sevens
  - Champions (1): 1927

=== Women's ===
- National Bowl
  - Champions (1): 2014
- Kirkcaldy Sevens
  - Champions (1): 2016

== Notable former players ==
=== Men ===
==== Edinburgh District ====
The following former Broughton RFC players have represented Edinburgh District.

- (Scotland) Doug Gallacher
- (Scotland) Bill McKay
- (Scotland) Robbie Robertson
- (Scotland) Dave McIntosh
- (Scotland) Alan Hoy
- (Scotland) George Simpson
- (Scotland) Geoff Gratton-Brunt

=== Women ===
==== International players ====
The following former Broughton RFC players have been given a senior cap by their national side.

- Finland

- (Finland) Anna Soiluva

== Retired Jerseys ==
=== Men ===
The following former Broughton RFC jerseys have been retired out of respect to former greats.

- (Scotland) No19. Robbie Robertson
