= Trinity Academicals RFC =

Rugby union club in Edinburgh, Scotland

Trinity Accies RFC
- Full name: Trinity Academicals RFC
- Union: Scottish Rugby Union
- Founded: 1912
- Location: Edinburgh, Scotland
- Ground: Bangholm
- President: C.A. Graham
- Coach: R. Wood - N. Morrison
- Captain: R.W. Calder
- League: East Division Three
| 1st kit | 2nd kit | 3rd kit |

Official website
- www.pitchero.com/clubs/trinityacademicals

Trinity Academicals RFC, nicknamed "Trinity Accies" or "T-Accs" is a rugby union club based in Leith, Edinburgh, Scotland, originally for the former pupils of Trinity Academy, Edinburgh. Trinity Accies competes in the East Division Three.

== History ==
=== Early days ===
Trinity Accies has not been a club to keep detailed records. As a result, details from its earliest days are impossible to establish. The club's earliest challenge games began in 1913/14 from get-togethers of former Trinity Academy pupils (opened in 1892 as Craighall Road School) in a shelter at Starbank Park, Newhaven. The players formed a team to play challenge matches against the lower ranks of existing clubs. The "Lomond" Trinity had no link to the school. They became members of the SRU in 1903 and played in purple and white hoops. They amalgamated with Edinburgh Borderers in 1945, becoming Trinity Borderers until 1947. Early Trinity Accies games were played at Victoria Park on an irregular basis with the club playing in blue with a red badge bearing the Leith Coat of Arms. After the war the club changed to black with a gold band as their playing jersey.

=== Between the wars ===
No rugby was played during World War I. In October 1920 (the season was October to March) the club resumed playing on a regular basis. Between the 2 World Wars Trinity was a lower grade, fairly average in terms of results, junior club. Frank Trotter, then Executive Officer of Education for Leith, gave the club access to a regular home ground, Bangholm, which was opened on 2 December 1920.

Fixtures in the 1920s and 1930s were mainly with still familiar clubs: RDVC (probably the strongest junior club over this 20 years), Leith Accies, Broughton, Boroughmuir, Bruntsfield, Edinburgh Borderers, Linlithgow, Moray House, Edinburgh Northern, Lismore, Penicuik and Lasswade. Less familiar names now largely forgotten include: Brunstane, Kenard, Westhall, Warriston, Gala Star, Edinburgh Rover Scouts, Kenmore, United Colleges, James Clarks FP, Grange, Broxburn HSFP, Balvaird and Dunedin. Away games took place at equally forgotten grounds: Forkenford, Broom Park, Ravelston, Hillend, Lady Napiers Park and Morgan Park.

From 1926 to 1931 the standard of play improved when James Hossack was appointed captain. He had played for Boroughmuir before being appointed as Head Geography teacher at Trinity Academy, which led to representative recognition for Trinity players with the Edinburgh Junior side (Edinburgh and District Union) for the first time.

As early as 5 November 1929 short reports on some of the club's games appeared in the press. On that date Trinity Accies beat Trinity at Lomond Park: "... with tries scored by Armstrong, Cowe and Furnivall."

=== After the war ===
Few games were played during World War II. 7-a-side tournaments were played at Bangholm in 1942 and 1943. Most senior clubs expected lower teams to beat their 2nds over a number of years before they would be considered for a 1st xv fixture. It was ranked by percentage of wins against these teams. Trinity started being featured in the 1963/64 season's table until 1972–73.

Few games were played in 1945–46 with former players returning from the war. However, 14–6 and 24–3 wins over Fettes and 6–8 and 12–14 losses to Edinburgh Wanderers / Academicals ("Charie Maclean scoring 3 tries") suggest playing improvements since before the war. By the 1950s we had regular fixtures with: Melrose, Langholm, Stewarts, Edinburgh Wanderers, Melville College and Selkirk (who by tradition we played away on 1 January.) Fixtures were slowly improving and the club joined the SRU as a full member in 1950. The goal was always to create a fixture list which would lead to the Press including us in the unofficial championship. A strong run of results – including victories over Stewarts (in a year when they won the championship), Melrose, RHS, Selkirk and Langholm – led to our appearing in the league table from 1963 to 1964.

At the end of the 1964–65 season Trinity Accies were ranked 17th of the 35 teams in the championship.

=== The arrival of the leagues ===
After many years in favour of an organised league structure, Trinity gave its full support to the SRU's proposal to introduce a formal system in 1973. Twelve teams were placed in each league playing each other once.

== Representative honours ==
=== Edinburgh ===
- Dougie Mitchell
- Ian Gibb
- Jimmy Taylor
- Gordon Connell
- Rab Murdoch
- Graeme Plenderleith
- Ian Moffat
- Julian Vaughan

=== Scotland age group ===
- Robin Hamilton
- Ross McNulty
- Lewis Niven
- Tom Drennan
- Sam Pecqueur

=== Scotland 7's ===
- Sam Pecqueur (49 Caps)

=== Scotland ===
- Gordon Connell (5 Caps)

=== British Lions ===
- Gordon Connell (1 Test v SA)

=== Captains Board ===
| Captain | Captain | Captain |
|---|---|---|
| R. Harcus - 1920-23 | R. Shaw - 1957-59 | A.D. Wilson - 1992-95 |
| J. Linton - 1923-25 | D.D. Laird - 1959-60 | K. McLuskey - 1995-98 |
| J. Hossack - 1925-26 | R.M. Halliday - 1960-61 | R.A. Rodriguez - 1998-00 |
| G. Palmer - 1926-30 | D.D Laird - 1961-62 | R. Hamilton - 2000-02 |
| J. Hossack - 1930-33 | J.G.H. Leith - 1962-65 | G. Gillie - 2002-03 |
| T.P. Palmer - 1933-34 | R. Gillie - 1965-67 | R. Hamilton - 2003-04 |
| A. McIntyre - 1934-35 | G.C. Connell - 1967-68 | D.W. Watson - 2004-06 |
| A. Sutherland - 1935-36 | F.D. Carson - 1968-69 | A.J Bruce - 2006-08 |
| J.C. Johnstone - 1936-37 | J. McLean - 1969-71 | S. Murray - 2008-10 |
| T.L. Wood - 1937-38 | G.H. Plenderleith - 1971-73 | S.A. Donnelly - 2010-11 |
| P.T.Johnstone - 1938-41 | A.M. Cosgrove - 1973-74 | C.D. Roulston - 2011-12 |
| R. Valentine - 1941-42 | J. Vaughan - 1974-75 | D.G Stroud - 2012-13 |
| J.T. Gray - 1942-43 | B.R. Clark - 1975-76 | K.J Campbell - 2013-14 |
| E.P. Cessford - 1943-44 | I.W. Moffat - 1976-77 | M.J Griffin - 2014-16 |
| C.D. Mallinson - 1944-45 | J.F. McGowan - 1977-78 | N. Morrison - 2016-20 |
| D.K. Graham - 1945-46 | E.B. Romanis - 1978-79 | D. Roulston - 2020-22 |
| A.E.S. Fairfull - 1946-47 | S.A.G. Miller - 1979-80 | J.W. Spencer - 2022-23 |
| G. Easton - 1947-48 | A.G. Spencer - 1980-82 | R.W. Calder - 2023- |
| J. Meikle - 1948-49 | A.M. Bennett - 1982-83 | |
| D.F. Mitchell - 1949-52 | E.B. Romanis - 1983-84 | |
| A.K. McWilliam - 1952-53 | G.D. Owen - 1984-86 | |
| G. Anderson - 1953-54 | D.J. Spencer - 1986-88 | |
| H.M. Gristwood - 1954-55 | G.S. Hall - 1988-90 | |
| I. Gibb 1955-57 - | G.R. Thompson - 1990-92 | |

=== Presidents Board ===
| President | President |
|---|---|
| A. Harcus - 1920-36 | J.E. Brooks - 1988-90 |
| J.C.L. Oliver 1940-51 | F.D. Carson - 1990-92 |
| W.M. Ross - 1951-66 | W.J. Burns 1992-03 |
| D.E. Fisher - 1966-69 | I.D. McCombie - 2003-07 |
| D.K. Graham - 1969-72 | A. G. Spencer - 2007-09 |
| D.P. Gibb - 1972-76 | G.S. Hall - 2009-11 |
| D.D. Laird - 1976-78 | R.T.N. Findlay - 2011-19 |
| W.S. Alston - 1978-80 | C.A. Graham 2019- |
| R.G. Falconer - 1980-82 | |
| D.P. Gibb - 1982-84 | |
| H.M. Gristwood - 1984-86 | |
| R. Gillie - 1986-88 | |

=== Honorary Members ===
| Name | Name |
|---|---|
| A.W. Harper | B. Clark |
| S.G. Ballantyne | R. Sutherland |
| C.C. Brown | G.R. Cormack |
| T. Kyle | P.G. Galloway |
| C. MacLean | G. Cunningham |
| A. MacLean | D.P Gibb |
| T.P. Palmer | J.F. Ellis |
| J.Y. Scott | D.D Laird |
| W.H. Scott | R. Gillie |
| A. Westwater | |
| L.L. ROmanis | |
| L. McGregor | |
| J. Yorston | |
| J.A. Meikle | |
| D.F. Mitchell | |
| J. Turpie | |
| D.K. Graham | |
| C.L.S. Hepburn | |
| J.J. Jardine | |
| J.M. Scrivener | |

== Championship winning teams ==
=== 1987/88 – Division 4 champions ===
Captained by Dougie Spencer, with Jack and Dougie Hamilton coaching the side, the club recovered from defeat in its first game to clinch the title in the last game. Lenzie 17- 20 L Leith Accies 12 - 9 W Biggar 9 - 6 W Broughton 26 - 6 W Hutchesons 19 - 9 W Wigtownshire 34 - 8 W Edin. Univ. 10 - 15 L Glenrothes 16 - 3 W Alloa 22 - 3 W Cambuslang 4 - 3 W Dumfries 20 - 4 W Peebles 18 - 3 W Clarkston 20 - 10 W

=== 1993/94 – Division 4 champions ===
The season started badly for a team captained by Andy Wilson and coached by Ian Henderson with defeats in two out of the first three games. Because of this all the rest of the games had to be won for promotion.

=== 2023/24 - East Region Division 3 Champions ===
Captained by Reece Calder, with Richard Wood & Neil Morrison coaching, the club finished the season with 9 wins, 2 losses and 1 draw. A final day defeat for Edinburgh Northern at the hands of Edinburgh Uni Medics saw Trinity claim the title on points difference.

== Promoted teams ==
=== 1974/75 – Division 3 promotion ===
Although only second in the league this team's record is the club's best ever, losing only one game. They gave Highland its only defeat but lost the title on points differential. The team was captained by Brian Clark and coached by Stan Grant.

=== 1978/79 – Division 3 promotion ===
Captain was Euan Romanis and coach was Fraser Mason. The club was promoted on points difference.

Thanks to Ian Webster the club has rare detailed playing records for all teams this promotion winning season: P W L D For Against 1st XV 24 15 9 0 368 229 2nd XV 21 14 7 0 367 212 3rd XV 17 11 5 1 352 193 4th XV 5 4 1 0 75 21 Colts 12 3 9 0 124 257 17

=== 1999/2000 - National League Division 2 promotion ===
Captained by Bob Rodriquez

== Rugby Teams/Sections ==
=== Ranking ===
Highlights included:

- Boroughmuir 14-12
- Stewarts 13-9
- Edin Wands 14-12
- Selkirk 23-5
- Haddington 21-0
- Edin Accies 3-3
- Musselburgh 12-11
- Dunfermline 14-0
- Kirkcaldy 9-8
- Hutchesons 20-3
- Langholm 8-8
- Greenock Wands 12-3
- Kelso 11-8
- Leith Accies 25-16
- Hawick 8-11

These players were also responsible for Trinity Accies' victory over a Scottish senior club. In September 1968 the backs with a number of forwards making up the numbers, all played in the club's 65–0 win over Melville College—a 95–0 win using current scoring values. The game took place a week after 5 of the club's backs played in a full Edinburgh trial. Of these Gordon Connell was our first Scottish international and British Lion, Graeme Plenderleith played for Edinburgh and Glasgow, and Rab Murdoch played for Edinburgh.

=== 7-a-side ===
Little had been heard of the club in pre-war 7s.

On 16 April 1945 the club's 7s were won for the first time. Reports list the team as: A Fairfull, D Graham, C Hepburn, J Meikle, E Cessford, G Armstrong and J Scott, with victories over Leith 15–0, Stewarts 9-0 and Edinburgh Wanderers / Accies 8–0. Unfortunately, after they won their first tie, "howling wind and torrential rain" stopped the 7s for the first time in 24 years.

With more tournaments being started Trinity continued to have many successes. Walkerburn was won for the first time in 1948 with an 11–10 victory over Hawick Y M in the final. Many wins at Walkerburn were to follow. Stirling County started its own 7s in 1948. The club won the first three finals. Peebles and Moray were other venues where cups were won on a number of visits.

=== Youth/School ===
Over the years the efforts of Alex Harper, Allan Spencer, and the long term rector Peter Galloway have kept the club well-supplied with players from school.

=== Touring ===
Early trips to Chesterfield have been followed by more exotic tours including Burnham (England), Hanover (Germany), Juan les Pins (France), St Gallen (Switzerland), Munich (Germany) and Avignon (France). Trinity Accies have hosted teams from all over the world.

== Honours ==
- Trinity Academicals Sevens
  - Champions (2): 1945, 1948
- Peebles Sevens
  - Champions (3): 1961, 1966, 1967
- Walkerburn Sevens
  - Champions (7): 1948, 1955, 1961, 1965, 1967, 1968, 1970
- Royal HSFP Sevens
  - Champions (1): 1990
