= Duns RFC =

Scottish rugby union club, based in Duns

(Scotland) Duns RFC
- Full name: Duns Rugby Football Club
- Nickname: The Dingers
- Emblem: Two Bears either side of a rugby ball
- Founded: 1878; 148 years ago
- Ground: Castle Park
- League(s): East Division 3 and BT Border Shield
- 2024–25: East Division 3, 4th of 8
Team kit

Official website
- www.pitchero.com/clubs/duns

Duns Rugby Football Club is a rugby union side based in Duns in Borders, Scotland. They are known as 'The Dingers' from the town motto, "Duns Dings A" (Duns Beats All).

Duns are a full member club of the Scottish Rugby Union. As of the 2025–26 season, Duns RFC 1st XV are in Division 3 of the East Regional League. Their home ground is Castle Park in Berwickshire.

== Youth rugby ==
Duns RFC operates various teams at the youth level within the Scottish Borders region. The club works in close co-operation with Duns Minis and Colts, who organise rugby at primary and early secondary school levels and are officially associated with the club, and the Berwickshire High School, which has squads for various age groups and play friendly matches.
