= Walkerburn RFC =

Scottish rugby union club, based in Walkerburn

- Full name: Walkerburn Rugby Football Club
- Emblem: SRFC on Blue background
- Founded: 1884; 142 years ago
- Ground: Caberston Haugh
- League: East Non-League
- 2024–25: East Non-League
Team kit

Official website
- www.walkerburnrugby.org.uk

Walkerburn Rugby Football Club is a rugby union side in the small village of Walkerburn in the Borders, Scotland.

They played in the East Non-League.

The club announced its closure on 17th April, 2024 citing a gradual decline in player participation and the lack of sufficient player numbers impacting their ability to compete effectively. The interest and support generated at that time granted the club a reprieve but in 2026 there was an official statement on social media that Walkerburn RFC would finally close on 30 May 2026 after that year's Sevens tournament.

== Walkerburn Sevens ==
The club organised the annual Walkerburn Sevens tournament. It was the finale of the Border Sevens Circuit; being the last Sevens tournament of the season. It is known as the Prince of the Sevens.

== Honours ==
- Walkerburn Sevens
  - Champions (11): 1911, 1912, 1914, 1923, 1925, 1927, 1928, 1930, 1934, 1936, 1966
- Peebles Sevens
  - Champions (7): 1923, 1925, 1928, 1930, 1931, 1934, 1950
