= Musselburgh RFC =

Scottish rugby union club, based in Musselburgh

Musselburgh
- Full name: Musselburgh Rugby Football Club
- Founded: 15 February 1921; 105 years ago
- Location: Musselburgh, Scotland
- Ground: Stoneyhill (Capacity: 3,000)
- President: Blair Stewart
- Coach: Andrew Clark
- Captain: Rory Watt
- League: Scottish National League Division One
- 2024–25: Scottish Premiership, 12th of 12 (relegated)
1st kit	2nd kit

Official website
- www.musselburghrfc.com

Musselburgh Rugby Football Club is a rugby union club based in Musselburgh, East Lothian, Scotland. The team play their home games at Stoneyhill and currently compete in the Scottish National League Division One, the top tier of Scottish club rugby.

Musselburgh RFC first applied to join the Edinburgh & District League in 1921 but it is believed that the town had a team for at least 20 years before that.

== History ==
The club was formed in 1921 as a section of the Musselburgh Sports Club. They initially played their games at Shirehaugh which is now a practice green at The Musselburgh Golf Club in Monktonhall. During the 1930s The Musselburgh Sports Club changed its name to become Musselburgh Rugby Football Club in its entirety.

During 1951, the club moved from its home at Shirehaugh to a new pitch at Stoneyhill where the club currently resides. A clubhouse was built on the site and opened in 1971, with changing rooms added in 1984 and a gym added in 2021.

After the creation of the new leagues in Scotland the club were placed in the third division, ultimately falling to fifth division in 1975. However they bounced back and continued to climb up the leagues where they were promoted to the Premiership for the first time in 1987, lasting one season before being relegated.

The club continued to stay around the second and third tiers before a sharp fall to the regional leagues in the late 2000s. The team slowly climbed their way back up to the National leagues before winning National 2 in 2015. With the formation of the Super6 in 2018, the top six teams from National 1 had the chance to be promoted to the Premiership to join the remaining four teams. Musselburgh claimed a bonus point on the final day of the season to win the final spot.

== Musselburgh Sevens ==
The club runs the Musselburgh Sevens tournament.

== Honours ==
- Scottish National League Division Two
  - Champions (2): 1984–85, 2014–15
- Musselburgh Sevens
  - Champions: 1949, 1950, 1951, 1957, 1987, 1988, 1990, 1993, 1997, 2003, 2008, 2009, 2010, 2013, 2015, 2018, 2019
- Highland Sevens
  - Champions: 1956, 1958, 1963, 1978, 1979
- Preston Lodge Sevens
  - Champions: 1992, 1993
- Glasgow University Sevens
  - Champions: 1957
- Kelso Harlequins Sevens
  - Champions: 1990
- Haddington Sevens
  - Champions: 1993, 1995
- North Berwick Sevens
  - Champions: 2002, 2009, 2010, 2011, 2017, 2018, 2022, 2023,2024,2025
- Scottish Rugby Shield
  - Runners-Up: (1) 2011-12
- Kelso Sevens
  - Champions (1): 1955
- Peebles Sevens
  - Champions (3): 1986, 1988, 1997
- Walkerburn Sevens
  - Champions (9): 1951, 1952, 1956, 1957, 1960, 1990, 1993, 2002, 2003
- Edinburgh Northern Sevens
  - Champions (1): 2013
- Portobello Sevens
  - Champions (1): 2023

== Notable former players ==
=== Ireland internationalists ===
- (Ireland) Marney Cunningham

=== Glasgow Warriors players ===
- (Scotland) Alan Kittle

=== Edinburgh District ===
The following former Musselburgh players have represented Edinburgh District at provincial level.

- (Scotland) D. Macdonald
