= Lismore RFC =

Scottish rugby union club, based in Edinburgh

- Full name: Lismore Rugby Football Club
- Emblem: Boar's head
- Founded: 1901; 125 years ago
- Ground(s): Inch Park Community Sports Club, Inch Park, Cameron Toll, Edinburgh
- Captain(s): Elliot Freeman & John Jones (co-captains)
- League(s): Men: East Division 3 Women: Scottish Women's Midlands & East Two
- 2024–25: Men: East Division 3, 5th of 8 Women: Scottish Women's Midlands & East Two, 4th of 8
1st kit	2nd kit

Lismore RFC is a rugby union side based in Edinburgh, Scotland. They were founded in 1901.

The men's side play in the East Division 3, the women's side play in Scottish Women's Midlands & East Two.

== History ==
Lismore's foundation dates back to 1901, when the Royal High School FP club was based at Jock's Lodge in the east of Edinburgh. Some of the players felt that they were being excluded from RHSFP's team, so started their own club, named after Lismore Crescent nearby. The club moved around several times, locating to Duddingston, and ending up in their present location in a south side clubhouse, and playing near Cameron Toll.

Milne's Bar on Rose Street, was their clubhouse around the Second World War period.

They started a women's side in 1994.

== Lismore Sevens ==
The club run the Lismore Sevens tournament, featuring a men's and women's competition. The men play for the Rattery Cup.

== Honours ==
=== Men ===
- Lismore Sevens
  - Champions: (1) 1990
- Edinburgh Northern Sevens
  - Champions: (5) 1980, 1981, 1983, 1986, 2010

=== Women ===
- Edinburgh Northern Sevens
  - Champions: (1) 1999
- Penicuik Sevens
  - Champions: 2024, 2025
