= Penicuik RFC =

Scottish rugby union club, based in Penicuik

- Full name: Penicuik Rugby Football Club
- Founded: 1924; 101 years ago
- Ground(s): Montgomery Park, Penicuik
- League(s): East Division 2
Team kit

Official website
- www.penicuikrugby.org

Penicuik Rugby Club is a rugby football club in the Scottish Rugby Union, playing their home games at Montgomery Park, Penicuik, Midlothian. Season 2015–16 saw the club become league champions of East Regional League Division Two, under the coaching duo of Mark Blair and Malcolm Clapperton. In season 2015-16 the Second XV under the coaching guidance of Richard Mann also gained promotion, to East Reserve league 2 having been runners up to Currie RFC on points.

== League Status ==
In season 2023/2024 the First XV will play in East League Division 2.

In season 2023 / 2024 the Second XV will play in East Reserve League Division 1.

== Senior Training ==
The senior teams train on a Tuesday and Thursday evening at 7.00pm under the coaching guidance of Blair, Sprott, Liddle, Mann and Cartwright. During the Autumn test period and on Six Nations weekends the club welcomes touring sides to their clubhouse.

== Representative Honours ==
The club have had a number of representative caps most notable amongst those is Jim Aitken, who captained the Scotland team to a Grand Slam victory in the 1984 Five Nations tournament. More recently Sarah Law represented Scotland Women both at Sevens and Fifteens and her younger sister, Rachel Law gained an under-20 cap in a game against Belgium Women.

== Sevens tournament ==
The club run the Penicuik Sevens tournament. Teams play for the President's Cup. The 2nd Scottish Regiment are the current holders (2023).

== Honours ==
- East Regional Division 2 - Champions Season 2015/2016
- Penicuik Sevens
  - Champions: 1980, 1987, 1989, 1991, 2022
- Livingston Sevens
  - Champions: 1972
- Lanark Sevens
  - Champions: 1971
- Old Aloysians Sevens
  - Champions: 1977
