= Haddington RFC =

Scottish rugby union club, based in Haddington

(Scotland) Haddington RFC
- Full name: Haddington Rugby Football Club
- Union: Scottish Rugby Union
- Founded: 1911; 115 years ago
- Location: Haddington, Scotland
- Ground: Neilson Park
- President: Keith Wallace
- Director of Rugby: Bob Snodgrass
- Coach: Kieran Cooney
- Captain: Gary Cockburn
- League: Scottish National League Division Four
- 2025–26: East Division One, 1st of 8 (promoted)
Team kit

Haddington Rugby Football Club is a rugby union team based in Haddington, East Lothian.

== History ==
Founded in 1911, the team plays its home games at Neilson Park.

Haddington player Jock Wemyss founded the Co-optimists; following a Barbarians inspired match in Haddington in 1924.

They compete in BT National League Division 3, the 3rd tier of Scottish club rugby.

== Player development ==
The minis section was set up almost 50 years ago by Bill Hamilton.

The minis and the School of Rugby with Knox Academy are key to the ongoing success serving as nursery for players. Haddington currently have over 100 kids in each; and the club recently managed to play a couple of girls matches as they seek to develop a woman's team.

There is a tradition of families serving the Club, with many sets of brothers, fathers sons and grandsons turning out.

=== World record ===
On 12 August 2018, the club set a world record of 467 for the most participants in a touch/mini/tag game of rugby, ratified by Guinness World Records. In the game, players from age 5 to 73 turned out, including 18 from the Snodgrass Family, covering three generations a former president and two former captains.

== Haddington Sevens ==
The club ran the Haddington Sevens tournament. Dating from 1926, the club claims it is the 10th oldest surviving in the world.

== Notable players ==
Six of the club's players have represented Scotland at full international level (caps in brackets (where known)):

- Scotland Men
  - (Scotland) Jock Wemyss (7)
  - (Scotland) RJC Ronnie Glasgow (10)
  - (Scotland) Derek White (41 + 1 British Lions)
  - (Scotland) Grant McKelvey (1)
  - (Scotland) Cammy Murray (26)
- Scotland Women
  - (Scotland) Sarah Higgins (40+)

Wemyss, at 17, was one of the five founding members. The male internationalists were honoured in a lunch in 2017, with tributes paid amongst others by Finlay Calder, Dave Rollo, Craig Chalmers, Barry Stewart and, for Wemyss, from the President of the Barbarians Micky Steele-Bodger.

White toured with the 1989 Lions and also played for the World XV against New Zealand at Eden Park in 1992 as part of the NZRFU Centenary Matches.

== Honours ==
=== Men ===
- Haddington Sevens
  - Champions (8): 1933, 1950, 1951, 1955, 1956, 1961, 1969, 1970
- Scottish National League Division Two
  - Champions (1): 2006-07
- Glasgow City Sevens
  - Champions (4): 1955, 1956, 1957, 1958
- Peebles Sevens
  - Champions (2): 1977, 1982
- Walkerburn Sevens
  - Champions (6): 1976, 1978, 1980, 2004, 2006, 2017, 2023
- Musselburgh Sevens
  - Champions (8): 1971, 1976, 1977, 1978, 1982, 1983, 1986, 1991
- Royal HSFP Sevens
  - Champions (1): 1985
- Preston Lodge Sevens
  - Champions (1): 1987
- Penicuik Sevens
  - Champions (2): 1969, 1985
- Edinburgh District Sevens
  - Champions (1): 1951
- North Berwick Sevens
  - Champions (4): 1970, 1971, 1977, 2014

=== Women ===
- Lismore Sevens
  - Champions (1): 1995
