= East Regional League (rugby union) =

Scottish sporting league

- Sport: Rugby union
- Founded: 1973
- No. of teams: 24 (three divisions)
- Country: Scotland
- Most recent champions: Div 1: Broughton RFC; Div 2: Dunbar RFC; Div 3: Earlston RFC
- Level on pyramid: 5–7
- Promotion to: Scottish National League Division Four
- Domestic cups: National Shield and Regional Bowl

The East Regional League (currently named the Arnold Clark East League for sponsorship reasons) is one of three Scottish Regional Leagues operated by the Scottish Rugby Union, which play at a level below that of the Scottish National Leagues structure. Originally, these divisions were district leagues under the jurisdiction of the Edinburgh & District Union and the Scottish Borders Union.

Winners of the top division progress to Scottish National League Division Four.

== East Regional League, 2025–26 ==
=== East One ===
- Broughton RFC
- Dalkeith RFC
- Dunbar RFC
- Haddington RFC
- Murrayfield Wanderers FC
- North Berwick RFC
- Langholm RFC
- Portobello RFC
- Ross High RFC

=== East Two ===
- Corstorphine RFC
- Earlston RFC
- Forrester RFC
- Hawick Harlequins
- Leith RFC
- Livingston RFC
- Penicuik RFC
- Royal HSFP

=== East Three ===
- Caledonian Thebans RFC
- Duns RFC
- Edinburgh University Medics RFC
- Edinburgh Northern RFC
- Hawick Linden RFC
- Inverleith RFC
- Lismore RFC
- Trinity Academicals RFC

=== East Non-League ===
- Eyemouth RFC
- Queensferry RFC
- RDVC RFC
- St Boswells RFC
- Walkerburn RFC

== See also ==
- Caledonia Regional League
- West Regional Leagues
