= Scottish Reserve League =

Scottish rugby union league

- Sport: Rugby union
- Founded: ?
- No. of teams: 102 (74 clubs, 8 divisions)
- Country: Scotland
- Most recent champion: Stirling County RFC

The Scottish Reserve League is the largest of the three organisations operating 2nd XV Leagues in Scotland. Originally all 2nd XV rugby union league matches were played under the auspices of the Scottish 2nd XV League, however in recent years a number of breakaways have occurred - clubs in the Scottish Borders forming their own Borders Championship, and clubs in Edinburgh and the Lothians the Edinburgh & Lothian 2nd XV League (although confusingly, some clubs have their 2nd XVs in the Scottish and their 3rd XVs in this breakaway body). A Caledonia 2nd XV League was established for 2005-2006 but abandoned without a game played, although a competition for clubs in the very north of Scotland - the Brin Cup - did go ahead. Moves are afoot to reunite the 2nd XV league system.

After a short lived "experiment" of a pod system to reduce travel, the leagues reverted to a straight pyramid system for Season 2012–13. The Caledonia District teams were all entered into the main league system to provide more regular opposition, leaving the regional reserve league with only two districts.

The league was formerly called the Inter-City 2nd XV League, then Scottish 2nd XV league prior to adopting its current title.

== Promotion and relegation ==
The operates on the basis of two up/two down between all division, except between the various Regional Division 1 and National Division 2, where only the winner of Division 1 West is promoted, and the winner of Division 1 East. Third XVs and lower teams can not play in the same or higher league as that of teams from their clubs and can not also be promoted to the National league.

== The Scottish Reserve League, National Divisions, 2012-2013 ==
=== Division One ===
- Aberdeen Grammar 2nd XV
- Ayr 2nd XV
- Boroughmuir 2nd XV
- Currie 2nd XV
- Dundee High 2nd XV
- Edinburgh Accies 2nd XV
- Glasgow Hawks 2nd XV
- Heriots 2nd XV
- Melrose 2nd XV
- Selkirk 2nd XV
- Stewart's Melville 2nd XV
- Stirling County 2nd XV

=== Division Two ===
- Biggar 2nd XV
- Dalziel 2nd XV
- Dumfries 2nd XV
- Dunfermline 2nd XV
- Gala A
- GHA 2nd XV
- Hamilton 2nd XV
- Hillhead/Jordanhill 2nd XV
- Kilmarnock 2nd XV
- Musselburgh 2nd XV
- Watsonians 2nd XV
- West of Scotland 2nd XV

== The Scottish Reserve League, Regional Divisions, 2012-2013 ==
There are two Regions: West and East.

== The Scottish Reserve League, West Region, 2012-2013 ==
=== Division One ===
- Alan Glens 2nd XV
- Cartha QP 2nd XV
- East Kilbride 2nd XV
- GHK 2nd XV
- Glasgow Accies 2nd XV
- Helensburgh 2nd XV
- Hillhead/Jordanhill 3rd XV
- Marr 2nd XV
- West of Scotland 3rd XV
- Whitecraigs 2nd XV

=== Division Two ===
- Cambuslang 2nd XV
- Clydebank 2nd XV
- Dalziel 3rd XV
- Garnock 2nd XV
- GHA 3rd XV
- Greenock 2nd XV
- Irvine 2nd XV
- Paisley 2nd XV
- Stewartry 2nd XV
- Strathendrick 2nd XV

=== Division Three A ===
- Ardrossan 2nd XV
- Bishopton 2nd XV
- Carrick 2nd XV
- Cartha QP 4th XV
- GHA 4th XV
- Lenzie 2nd XV
- Loch Lomond 2nd XV
- Marr 3rd XV
- Waysiders/Drumpellier 2nd XV
- Whitecraigs 3rd XV

=== Division Three B ===
- Annan 2nd XV
- Cartha QP 3rd XV
- Cumbernauld 2nd XV
- Cumnock 2nd XV
- Dumfries 3rd XV
- Hamilton 3rd XV
- Kilmarnock 3rd XV
- Paisley 3rd XV
- Uddingston 2nd XV

== The Scottish Reserve League, East Region, 2012-2013 ==
=== Division One ===
- Boroughmuir 3rd XV
- Edinburgh Accies 3rd XV
- Forrester 2nd XV
- Haddington A
- Jed-Forest A
- Kelso A
- Lasswade 2nd XV
- Murrayfield 2nd XV
- Peebles A
- Preston Lodge 2nd XV
- RHC 2nd XV
- Selkirk 3rd XV

=== Division Two ===
- Edinburgh Accies 4th XV
- Heriots 3rd XV
- Linlithgow 2nd XV
- Lismore 2nd XV
- Melrose 3rd XV
- North Berwick 2nd XV
- Portobello 2nd XV
- Ross High 2nd XV
- Stewart's Melvilee 3rd XV
- Watsonians 3rd XV

=== Division Three A ===
- Currie 3rd XV
- Duns 2nd XV
- Edinburgh Northern 2nd XV
- Forrester 3rd XV
- Lasswade 3rd XV
- Murrayfield 3rd XV
- Musselburgh 3rd XV
- Trinity Accies 2nd XV

=== Division Three B ===
- Biggar 3rd XV
- Dalkeith 2nd XV
- Dunbar 2nd XV
- Inverlieth 2nd XV
- Linlithgow 3rd XV
- Livingston 2nd XV
- Preston Lodge 3rd XV
- RHC 3rd XV
