= Scottish National League Division Three =

Rugby union league

- Formerly: National League Division One, Premiership Division Four, National League Division Four
- Sport: Rugby union
- Founded: 1973
- No. of teams: 10
- Country: Scotland
- Most recent champion: Preston Lodge (3rd title)
- Most titles: Gordonians, Howe of Fife, Lasswade, Perthshire, Preston Lodge (3 titles)
- Level on pyramid: 4
- Promotion to: National League Division Two
- Relegation to: National League Division Four
- Domestic cup: National League Cup

The Scottish National League Division Three (known as Arnold Clark National League Division 3 for sponsorship reasons) is the fourth tier of the Scottish League Championship for amateur rugby union clubs in Scotland.

The division was established in its current format in 2014 after the creation of three national leagues below the Premiership. This replaced the two regional Championship Leagues which were scrapped after just two seasons.

== History ==
Until 2011, the name of the division was given to the sixth tier of amateur club rugby in Scotland. For season 2012–13, league reconstruction reduced the number of nationwide leagues from six to two and the division ceased to exist; however, further changes in 2014–15 increased the amount of nationwide leagues to four, and with it the National League Division Three name returned.

== Promotion and Relegation ==
The top team is promoted to National League Division 2 and the bottom team is relegated to National League Division 4.

== 2026–27 Teams ==
Location of teams in 2026-27 Scottish National League Division Three

Departing were Preston Lodge, promoted to National League Division 2 while Garnock were relegated to National League Division 4.

Joining were Berwick relegated from National League Division 2 and Cartha Queens Park promoted from National League Division 4.

Team	Ground	Location	2025–26
Allan Glen's	The Bearyards	Bishopbriggs	4th
Aberdeen Grammar	Rubislaw Playing Fields	Aberdeen	5th
Berwick	Scremerston	Scremerston, England	Relegated (10th)
Cartha Queens Park	Dumbreck	Glasgow	Promoted (1st)
Dumfries Saints	Park Farm	Dumfries	2nd
Hillhead Jordanhill	Hughenden	Glasgow	7th
Lasswade	Hawthornden	Bonnyrigg	8th
Orkney	Pickaquoy	Kirkwall	9th
Strathmore	Inchmacoble Park	Forfar	6th
West of Scotland	Burnbrae	Milngavie	3rd

== Past winners ==
Winners of the fourth tier competition – includes National League Division 4 (1973–1995), Premiership Division Four (1996–1997), National League Division 1 (1998–2012), and National League Division Three (2015–present)

National League Division Four

1974. Highland
1975. Marr
1976. Preston Lodge
1977. Howe of Fife
1978. Kelvinside
1979. Musselburgh
1980. Stirling County
1981. Dalziel
1982. Broughton
1983. Greenock Wanderers
1984. Perthshire
1985. Corstorphine
1986. Currie
1987. East Kilbride
1988. Trinity Academicals
1989. Wigtownshire
1990. Perthshire
1991. Dumfries Saints
1992. Morgan Academy
1993. Stewartry
1994. Trinity Academicals
1995. Glenrothes

Premiership Division Four

1996. Kilmarnock
1997. Gordonians

National League Division 1

1998. East Kilbride
1999. Hutchesons Aloysians
2000. Glasgow Southern
2001. Haddington
2002. Dunfermline
2003. Hillhead/Jordanhill
2004. Livingston
2005. Perthshire
2006. Hamilton
2007. Irvine
2008. Falkirk
2009. Howe of Fife
2010. Dalziel
2011. Lasswade
2012. Hawick YM
2013. Championship Leagues A and B
2014. Championship Leagues A and B

National League Division 3

2015. Lasswade
2016. GHK
2017. Dumfries Saints
2018. Highland
2019. Gordonians
2020. Null and void
2021. No competition
2022. Lasswade
2023. Gordonians
2024. Preston Lodge
2025. Howe of Fife
2026. Preston Lodge
