= University rugby union leagues in Scotland =

- Sport: Rugby union
- No. of teams: 28 Men's (six divisions), 8 Women's (one division)
- Country: Scotland

University rugby union in Scotland is predominantly organised through BUCS, the British Universities Sports Association. Unlike in England and Wales, where a pyramid system of 4 regions and a Premier above exists, the Scottish system is separate. However, Scottish universities do receive places in the end of season knock-out tournaments which decide overall British champions (see individual division entries below). However, due to the small size of the divisions (with clubs playing either 6 or 8 fixtures per season), some Scottish universities organise teams to play in regional or national leagues as part of the general Scottish league system for clubs, the Scottish League Championship. In addition, some universities organise University Saturday Leagues for their 2nd XV (see below), or they organise informal friendly matches. The following universities have teams playing elsewhere in Scottish Rugby:

- Edinburgh University RFC play in Division One of the Scottish National Leagues.
- Royal Dick Veterinary College RFC, which is part of the University of Edinburgh, play in Division Two of the Scottish National League, East. They do not participate in BUSA or USL leagues.
- Aberdeen University RFC, St Andrews University RFC and Stirling University RFC play in Division One of the Scottish National League, Caledonia.
- Edinburgh University RFC, 2nd XV play in the 2nd Division(East) of The Scottish 2nd XV League.
- Edinburgh University RFC, 3rd XV play in the 3rd Division (East)of The Scottish 2nd XV League.
- Edinburgh University RFC, 4th XV(Freshers) play in SRU development leagues
- Edinburgh University WRFC play in the Premier Division of the SWRU League. They participate in the BUSA Premier North league, whilst their 2nd XV plays in the SUSA League.
- Dundee University WRFC, Glasgow University WRFC and The Saints WRFC (St Andrews University) play in the First Division of the SWRU League.

Scotland is allocated the current proportion of places in the BUSA end of season knock-out tournaments:

- 2 of the 16 places in the BUCS Championship
- 2 of the 16 places in the BUCS Trophy
- 2 of the 16 places in the BUCS Shield
- 2 of the 32 places in the BUCS Plate
- 8 of the 32 places in the BUCS Vase
- 2 of the 16 places in the BUCS Women's Championship

A Scottish Universities Cup is also held, usually towards the end of the season.

== BUSA Scottish Conference, 2010-2011 ==
Promotion and relegation has usually been one up, one down, but with play-offs for teams at the top of the groups in Division 3 and Division 4. The teams play in the Scottish conference.

BUSA fixtures are predominantly played on Wednesdays, as this is (traditionally) a university half-day, without afternoon classes.

=== Division 1A ===
- Aberdeen
- Napier
- Dundee
- St Andrews

Details:

The top two teams advance to the BUSA Championship, a UK-wide knock-out tournament. The bottom two teams advance to the BUSA Trophy.

Dundee are the current Scottish champions from the 2011/12 season.

=== Division 2A ===
- Herriot-Watt
- Napier
- Glasgow
- Glasgow Caledonian
- Strathclyde

Details:

The top two teams advance to the BUSA Shield. The bottom two teams advance to the BUSA Plate.

=== Division 3A ===
- Aberdeen 2nd XV
- Abertay
- Edinburgh 2nd XV
- St Andrews 2nd XV

Details:

=== Division 4A ===
- Aberdeen 3rd XV
- Dundee 2nd XV
- Heriot-Watt 2nd XV
- Queen Margaret
- Scottish Agricultural

Details:

Top two teams in both pools advance to the BUSA Vase.

=== Division 5A ===
- Aberdeen 4th XV
- Dundee 3rd XV
- Edinburgh 3rd XV
- Edinburgh 4th XV
- Heriot-Watt 3rd XV
- Strathclyde 2nd XV

Details:

Top two teams in both pools advance to the BUSA Vase.

== BUSA Women's Scottish Conference ==
There is one organised women's university league, containing the following teams:

- Aberdeen
- Dundee
- Edinburgh 2nd XV^{1}
- Glasgow
- Heriot-Watt
- St Andrews
- Stirling

Details:

^{1}Edinburgh 1st XV participates in the Premier League North Division.

Top two team advances to the BUSA Women's Championship.
