= 2021–22 Scottish Women's Premiership season =

Scottish rugby union season

Tennent's Women's Premiership 2021-2022
- Countries: Scotland
- Date: 12 September 2021 – 29 January 2022

The Tennent's Women's Premiership 2021–2022 kicked off on 12 September 2021.

== Teams ==
Ayr RFC step down from the Premiership to National League Division 1, they were replaced by the Heriot’s Blues Women who were runner-up in the Premiership Play Off in 2019.

Teams
Heriot Blues Women
Watsonians
Corstorphine
Stirling County
Cartha Queens Park
Hillhead Jordanhill

== Regular season ==
=== Standings ===
Tennent's Women's Premiership 2021-2022 – Regular season
Team	P	W	L	D	PF	PA	PD	TB	LB	C	U	Pts
Watsonian FC	10	6	2	2	199	163	36	5	0	0	0	33
Hillhead Jordanhill RFC	10	6	2	2	207	126	81	3	1	0	0	32
Corstorphine RFC	10	6	3	1	175	118	57	3	1	0	0	30
Stirling County RFC	10	4	5	1	238	200	29	6	2	0	0	26
Heriot's Blues Women	10	3	6	1	165	228	-63	3	1	0	0	18
Cartha Queens Park RFC	10	1	8	1	122	262	-140	1	2	0	0	9
Updated: 16 January 2022; Source:

=== Results ===
==== Week 1 ====
12 September 2021

Heriot's Blues Women	22 - 25	Watsonian FC

12 September 2021

Cartha Queens Park RFC	12 - 14	Hillhead Jordanhill RFC

12 September 2021

Corstorphine RFC	34 - 24	Stirling County RFC

==== Week 2 ====
19 September 2021

Hillhead Jordanhill RFC	21 - 12	Heriot's Blues Women

19 September 2021

Watsonian FC	0 - 17	Corstorphine RFC

19 September 2021

Stirling County RFC	25 - 12	Cartha Queens Park RFC

==== Week 3 ====
26 September 2021

Heriot's Blues Women	19 - 35	Corstorphine RFC

26 September 2021

Hillhead Jordanhill RFC	21 - 19	Stirling County RFC

26 September 2021

Cartha Queens Park RFC	10 - 27	Watsonian FC

==== Week 4 ====
3 October 2021

Stirling County RFC	19 - 43	Heriot's Blues Women

3 October 2021

Watsonian FC	22 - 22	Hillhead Jordanhill RFC

==== Week 5 ====
10 October 2021

Heriot's Blues Women	32 - 24	Cartha Queens Park RFC

10 October 2021

Stirling County RFC	48 - 19	Watsonian FC

10 October 2021

Hillhead Jordanhill RFC	5 - 11	Corstorphine RFC

==== Week 6 ====
17 October 2021

Corstorphine RFC	28 - 0	Cartha Queens Park RFC

==== Week 7 ====
24 October 2021

Watsonian FC	33 - 9	Heriot's Blues Women

24 October 2021

Hillhead Jordanhill RFC	67 - 7	Cartha Queens Park RFC

24 October 2021

Stirling County RFC	27 - 12	Corstorphine RFC

==== Week 8 ====
31 October 2021

Corstorphine RFC	8 - 17	Watsonian FC

==== Week 9 ====
5 November 2021

Cartha Queens Park RFC	32 - 20	Stirling County RFC

5 November 2021

Heriot's Blues Women	5 - 26	Hillhead Jordanhill RFC

==== Week 10 ====
14 November 2021

Corstorphine RFC	10 - 12	Heriot's Blues Women

14 November 2021

Stirling County RFC	17 - 19	Hillhead Jordanhill RFC

14 November 2021

Watsonian FC	29 - 21	Cartha Queens Park RFC

==== Week 11 ====
21 November 2021

Heriot's Blues Women	17 - 39	Stirling County RFC

21 November 2021

Cartha Queens Park RFC	14 - 20	Corstorphine RFC

21 November 2021

Hillhead Jordanhill RFC	12 - 21	Watsonian FC

==== Week 12 ====
5 December 2021

Cartha Queens Park RFC	0 - 0	Heriot's Blues Women

- League match cancelled, points shared and a friendly match arranged as requested by the clubs. Re-scheduled from 28.11.21 (Snow)

5 December 2021

Watsonian FC	0 - 0	Stirling County RFC

- League match cancelled and points shared with the clubs played a friendly at Bridgehaugh. Re-scheduled from 28.11.21 (Frozen Pitch)

5 December 2021

Corstorphine RFC	0 - 0	Hillhead Jordanhill RFC

- League match cancelled, points shared and a friendly match arranged as requested by the clubs. Re-scheduled from 28.11.21 (pitch unfit)
