= Jake Shearer =

- Born: 9 November 2005 (age 21) Drongan, Scotland
- Height: 1.86 m (6 ft 1 in)
- Weight: 113 kg (249 lb; 17 st 11 lb)

Rugby union career
- Position: Prop
Amateur team(s)
Years	Team	Apps	(Points)
2017-20	Cumnock		
2020-24	Ayr		
Senior career
Years	Team	Apps	(Points)
2023	Futures XV		
2024	Ayrshire Bulls		
2024-	Glasgow Warriors	1	(0)
International career
Years	Team	Apps	(Points)
2023	Scotland U18		
2024	Scotland U20		

Jake Shearer (born 9 November 2005) is a Scottish rugby union player who plays for Glasgow Warriors. He plays as a Prop. He previously played for the Ayrshire Bulls and the amateur side Cumnock.

== Rugby Union career ==
=== Amateur career ===
He played school rugby for Cumnock Academy, now The Robert Burns Academy. He also played for Cumnock, but as his local team were often short of players he left there to join Ayr.

Shearer won the National Youth U18 Shield in 2023 with Ayr, beating Melrose Wasps 36 -7 at Murrayfield Stadium.

=== Professional career ===
As a 18 year old he played with the Futures XV in the Super Series in 2023. He then played for Ayrshire Bulls in the 2024 Super Series. He made 4 appearances for the Bulls.

He was picked up by the Glasgow Warriors academy for season 2024–25. He played for Glasgow Warriors 'A' in their match against Benetton Treviso U23 and also played the Warriors 'A' match against the Georgian side Black Lion in May 2025.

He made his competitive United Rugby Championship debut against the Lions at Scotstoun Stadium on 30 October 2026, playing from the start. The Warriors won the match with a bonus point win, in a 29 points to 20 points victory. He became Glasgow Warrior No. 383.

=== International career ===
He played for Scotland U18.

He was part of the side that beat USA U20 in the World U-20 Trophy final, securing Scotland U20s promotion to the 2025 World Rugby U20 Championship.

== Outside of rugby ==
He is studying Business Data Analysis at Strathclyde University.
