= West Regional League (rugby union) =

Scottish Rugby Union regional league

- Sport: Rugby union
- Founded: 1973
- No. of teams: 34 (Three Divisions)
- Country: Scotland
- Most recent champions: Div 1: Greenock Wanderers; Div 2: Lenzie; Div 3: Waysiders Drumpellier
- Level on pyramid: 5–7
- Promotion to: Scottish National League Division Three
- Domestic cups: Tennents Shield and Tennents Regional Bowl

The West Regional League is one of three Regional Leagues operated by the Scottish Rugby Union, which play at a level below that of the National League structure.

Winners of the top division progress to Scottish National League Division Three, which was Greenock Wanderers in 2018-19

== Tennents West Regional League 2021-2022 ==
In League One, with the exception of Carrick, the teams remained the same as the 2019-20 season, due to the covid 19 pandemic. In League Three, the Isle of Mull RFC moved to non-league status.

=== West One ===
- Allan Glen's RFC
- Annan RFC
- Cambuslang RFC
- Carrick
- East Kilbride RFC
- Garnock RFC
- Irvine RFC
- Kilmarnock RFC
- Lenzie RFC
- Stewartry RFC
- Strathendrick RFC

=== West Two ===
- Clydebank RFC
- Cumnock RFC
- Dalziel RFC
- Helensburgh RFC
- Oban Lorne RFC
- Paisley RFC
- Strathaven RFC
- Uddingston RFC
- Waysiders Drumpellier
- Wigtownshire RFC

=== West Three ===
- Birkmyre RFC
- Bishopton RFC
- Cowal RFC
- Clydesdale RFC
- Cumbernauld RFC
- Glasgow University Medics RFC
- Hyndland RFC
- Lanark RFC
- Lochaber RFC
- Loch Lomond RFC
- Moffat RFC
- Shawlands FP RFC

=== West Non-League ===
- Bute RFC
- Campbeltown Kintryre
- Colonsay RFC
- Etive Vikings
- HMNB Clyde RFC
- Islay RFC
- Isle of Arran RFC
- Isle of Jura RFC
- Isle of Mull RFC
- Mid Argyll RFC
- Millbrae RFC
- Police Scotland Glasgow

== See also ==
- Caledonia Regional League
- East Regional League
