= Scottish National League Division Four =

- Sport: Rugby union
- Founded: 1973
- No. of teams: 10
- Country: Scotland
- Most recent champion: Cartha Queens Park
- Level on pyramid: 5
- Promotion to: National League Division Three
- Relegation to: Regional Leagues
- Domestic cup: National League Cup

The Scottish National League Division Four (known as Arnold Clark National League Division 4 for sponsorship reasons) is the fifth tier of the Scottish League Championship for amateur rugby union clubs in Scotland.

== History ==
A national fifth tier of the Scottish League Championship existed under a number of different names prior to the end of the 2010–11 season, at which point the league structure was reduced to four national divisions.

The division was reintroduced first by a play-off for entry at the end of season 2022–23.

Then the division started full operation for the 2023–24 season with 10 teams.

== Promotion and relegation ==
The top team is promoted to National League Division Three and the bottom three teams relegated to the Regional Leagues structure, making room for the champions from the Caledonia, East, and West region leagues.

== 2026-27 Teams ==
Location of teams in 2026–27 Scottish National League Division Four

Departing were Cartha Queens Park, promoted to National League Division Three while Moray were relegated to the Regional Leagues. Ellon had previously withdrawn during the season.

Joining were Garnock, relegated from National League Division Three together with Haddington and Lenzie , promoted from the Regional Leagues.

With two clubs departing and three joining the league was restored to ten sides.

Team	Ground	Location	2025–26
Ardrossan Academicals	Memorial Field	Ardrossan	2nd
Dunfermline	McCane Park	Dunfermline	8th
Garnock	Lochshore	Glengarnock	Relegated (10th)
Haddington	Neilson Park	Haddington	Promoted (East)
Hamilton	Laigh Bent	Hamilton	5th
Kilmarnock	Bellsland	Kilmarnock	3rd
Lenzie	Viewfield	Lenzie	Promoted (West)
Linlithgow	Mains Park	Linlithgow	4th
Stewartry	Greenlaw	Castle Douglas	7th
Whitecraigs	West Lodge	Newton Mearns	6th

== Past winners ==
Winners of the fifth tier competition – includes National League Division Two (–2011), and National League Division Four (2024–present)

National League Division 2

2007. Falkirk
2008. Howe of Fife
2009. Whitecraigs
2010. Greenock Wanderers
2011. Hawick YM

2012–2023 no national fifth tier

National League Division 4

2024. Garnock
2025. Strathmore
2026. Cartha Queens Park
