= Broadwood Stadium =

Football stadium in Cumbernauld, Scotland

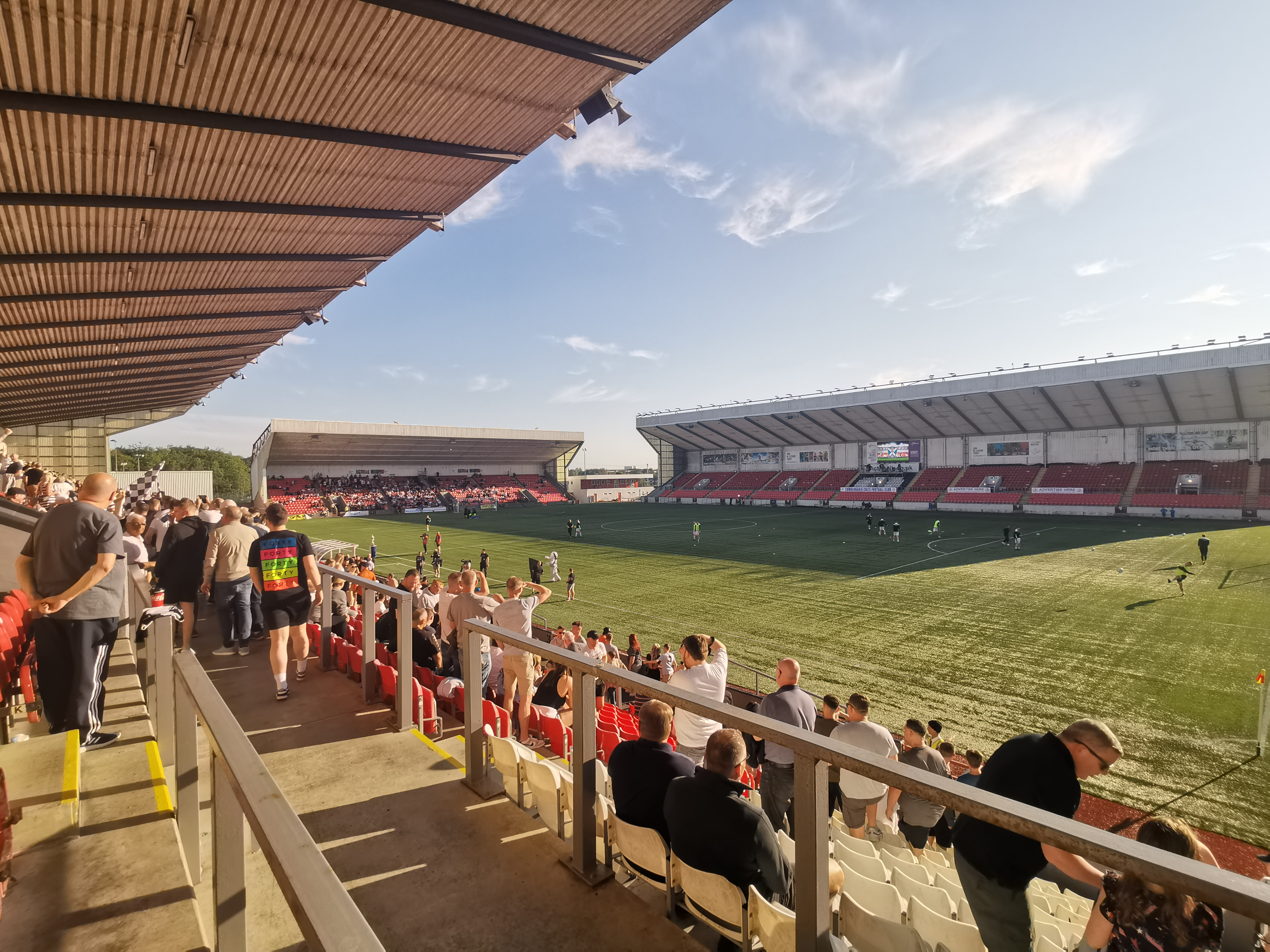
- Broadwood in 2023, as venue of the Scottish Junior Cup final

- Location in North Lanarkshire
- Location: Cumbernauld, Scotland
- Coordinates: 55°56′41″N 4°02′14″W
- Owner: Broadwood Stadium Company (owned by North Lanarkshire Council)
- Capacity: 8,086
- Surface: 3G artificial pitch
- Field size: 112 x 76 yards (pitch)

Construction
- Opened: 1994
- Cost: £8 million
- Architect: Walker Group

Tenants
- Clyde F.C. (1994–2022); Airdrieonians F.C. (1994–1998); Cumbernauld Colts F.C. (2012–present); Scottish Rugby Academy, West (2015–present); Glasgow City F.C. (2020–2021); Broomhill F.C. (2022–2023); Rangers W.F.C (2022–present); Hamilton Academical F.C. (2025–present)

Broadwood Stadium is a multi-use community stadium and sports complex in the Westfield area of Cumbernauld, North Lanarkshire. The stadium is currently the home of Scottish League One side Hamilton Academical, as well as Cumbernauld Colts of the Scottish Lowland Football League, and Rangers W.F.C of the Scottish Women's Premier League.

It was the home stadium of Clyde from 1994 to 2022 and Broomhill for the 2022-23 season, during which the club was rebranded as Open Goal Broomhill. Glasgow City of the Scottish Women's Premier League shared the stadium for the 2020–21 season. The Scottish Rugby Academy for the Glasgow & The West region is based at Broadwood, and it is also home to the Cumbernauld Centurions BMX Club on the National Level BMX track.

Broadwood has staged the final of football's Scottish Challenge Cup on four occasions and Scottish rugby's Finals Day. The stadium has also held international Rugby league.

== Football ==
Clyde previously played in Glasgow at Barrowfield Park from their creation in 1877 until 1898, and then Shawfield Stadium from 1898 until they were evicted in 1986. Clyde shared Firhill with fierce rivals Partick Thistle from 1986 until 1991, and then Douglas Park with Hamilton Academical until moving to the purpose built Broadwood in 1994. The move to Broadwood, 10 miles outside Glasgow, meant that the club would lose some fans in the move, but hoped to gain some new supporters in the new town of Cumbernauld, which had never hosted senior football before.

The stadium opened to the public in February 1994 to a full house at that time of 6,000 spectators. Clyde lost the game 3–0 against Hamilton Academical. At the time of opening only two stands, the Main Stand and the West Stand, had been completed, giving a capacity of 6,000. The third, South Stand was completed in 1997 to bring the overall capacity to just over 8,000. Plans to complete the stadium and bring the overall capacity to 10,000 were shelved after Clyde failed to win promotion to the Scottish Premier League in 2004. The site of the fourth stand was replaced by a community sports centre which opened in 2013.

The stadium also previously hosted another Scottish League club, Airdrieonians, between 1994 and 1998. Broadwood also formerly hosted Rangers reserve team matches on a regular basis. Broadwood has hosted many Scotland U-21 matches. Broadwood was the scene of a giant Scottish Cup shock in 2006, when Clyde beat holders Celtic 2–1. Broadwood has also hosted four Scottish Challenge Cup finals.

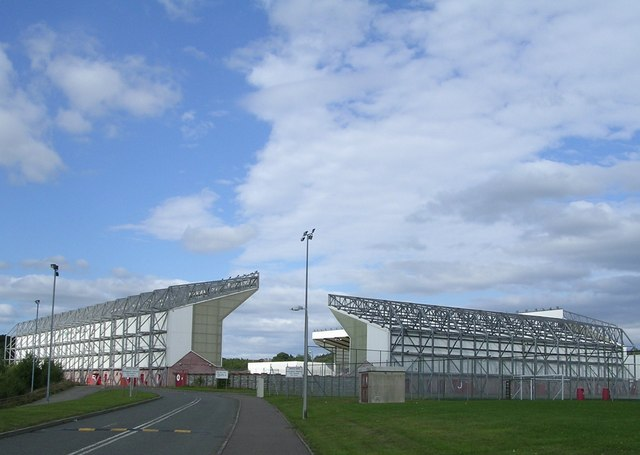
Exterior in 2006.

It was announced in 2015 that Cumbernauld Colts would play senior games at the stadium having been accepted into the Scottish Lowland Football League.

Scottish Women's Premier League club Glasgow City played at Broadwood for the 2020–21 season due to the unavailability of their regular ground, Petershill Park.

Lowland League side Broomhill made a one-season move to Broadwood in 2022, during which the club was rebranded as Open Goal Broomhill. The team moved on to the Dumbarton Football Stadium at the start of the 2023-24 campaign.

In 2024, Broadwood hosted the Strathclyde Demolition Cup final which saw Drumchapel United defeat Neilston Juniors 3-0.

== Rugby ==
Broadwood has been used for one-off games by Cumbernauld RFC.

It was chosen to host the 2014 Finals Day. Heriots beat Hawks in the RBS Cup Final 31–10.

It is home to Scottish Rugby Academy, Glasgow and the West. Work is now underway to create a new purpose-built facility, on-site, with fitness and medical equipment, all part of Scottish Rugby's major policy initiative to develop a regional Academy system that provides the best possible support to players, both male and female, who have been identified as having genuine potential for the future.

The stadium was also home to the inaugural Rugby League Commonwealth Championships; a 9s competition entered by 8 teams from the Commonwealth, won by the Papua New Guinea national rugby league team.

== Structure and facilities ==
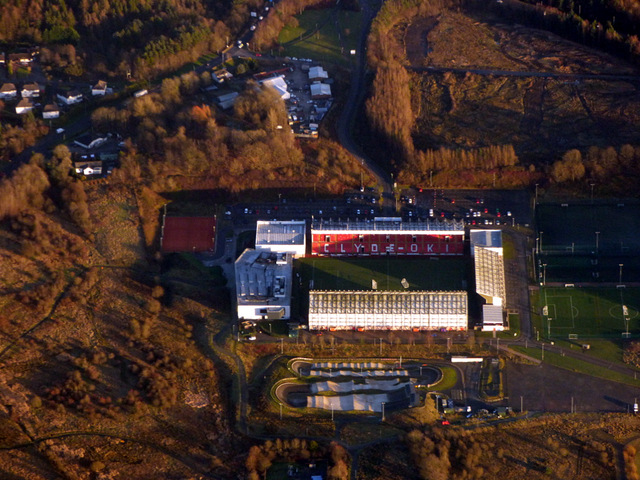
Broadwood Stadium from the air

Broadwood has three all seated stands with a capacity of 7,936. It is equipped with a full size astroturf pitch. It also has four 5-a-side pitches for public use, changing rooms, and a gymnasium, the latter being located to the north side of the pitch.

For the 2012–13 season, Clyde will play their football on a new 3rd generation synthetic pitch. Broadwood will hence become a multi-purpose stadium.

It has a purpose-built rugby facility, on-site, with state-of-the-art fitness and medical equipment.

== Future ==
Along with the introduction of a 3G surface, Broadwood was shared between Cumbernauld Colts and Clyde. Cumbernauld Colts are now the primary licence holders of the Stadium and the site is used 7 days a week. The Colts community development programme means that all age ranges use the stadium on a daily basis. With Colts entering the Scottish Lowland League, Broadwood Stadium will host a second senior club from 2015 to 2016.

Clyde announced in December 2010 their intention to leave Broadwood for a site elsewhere. In October 2011, they revealed that East Kilbride was one of the possible locations that they were exploring. They continued to play home games at Broadwood as secondary licence holders. Clyde did however have priority over first team matches. In June 2015, The Herald reported that Clyde's preferred option was to return to Glasgow, sharing with Shettleston Juniors.

In April 2022, Clyde announced they would be leaving Broadwood at the end of the 2021–22 season, ending their 28-year stay in Cumbernauld. They entered ground-sharing with Hamilton Academical at New Douglas Park from the start of the 2022–23 season, with a view of relocating to a new home back in Glasgow in the near future. Clyde's last match at Broadwood ended in a 5–0 defeat to Airdrieonians on 23 April 2022. Three years after Clyde departed, Hamilton Academical became new tenants at Broadwood due to an ownership dispute at New Douglas Park; as Clyde remained in Hamilton, the two clubs had essentially exchanged stadia. At the end of the season they played against each other in the 2026 playoff final, involving one leg at each ground with the traditional occupiers as the away side (Hamilton won 5–4 on aggregate).

== See also ==
- Stadium relocations in Scottish football
