= Edinburgh Napier University RFC =

- Full name: Edinburgh Napier University Rugby Football Club
- Location: Edinburgh, Scotland
- Ground(s): Sighthill campus, Edinburgh
- League(s): Men: East Non-League; Women: Scottish Womens Non-League
- 2024–25: Men: East Non-League; Women: Scottish Womens Non-League
| 1st kit | 2nd kit |

Official website
- www.facebook.com/ENUWR/

Union website
- www.facebook.com/Rugbynapier/

Edinburgh Napier University RFC is a rugby union club based in Edinburgh, Scotland. The club operates a men's team and a women's team. Both currently play in the university leagues.

== History ==
The East regional academy of the Scottish Rugby Academy has been based at Napier University since 2015.

=== varsity ===
Every year towards the end of the season, both the Men's team and Women's team compete in varsity matches against Queen Margaret University RFC.

The reason why they play against Queen Margaret University is due to the similar historic roots that the universities have. Both Institutions started off as colleges that specialised in certain skills, before merging and expanding with several other colleges around Edinburgh across the 20th century. Varsity is used as a way to celebrate the origins of both universities and promote local rivalry in all sports played within their doors.

== Sides ==
The men's team has a 1st and 2nd XV.

Training takes place on Boroughmuir RFC's ground at Meggetland on Monday nights from 6.30-8.30pm. A second training session takes place on the Sighthill Campus on Fridays.

== Honours ==
=== Men ===
- Scottish Conference 2A
  - Champions (1): 2011–12
- Scottish Conference 3A
  - Champions (1): 2009–10
- Scottish Conference 3B
  - Champions (1): 2004–05
- Scottish Conference 4A
  - Champions (1): 2008–09

=== Women ===
- Scottish Conference 2A
  - Champions (1): 2017-18
