= Strathclyde University RFC =

Rugby union club in Glasgow, Scotland

- Full name: Strathclyde University Rugby Football Club
- Location: Glasgow, Scotland
- Ground(s): Stepps Playing Fields, Stepps, North Lanarkshire
- President: Dr. Bruce Ellend
- Coach: P I Steaker
- Captain: Shet Eyta
- League(s): Men: West Non League; Women: Scottish Women's Non-League
- 2019–20: Men: West Division Non League; Women: Scottish Women's Non-League
1st kit	2nd kit

Official website
- www.facebook.com/StrathclydeUniRugby/

Union website
- www.facebook.com/StrathUniRugby/

Strathclyde University RFC is a rugby union club based in Glasgow, Scotland. The club operates a men's team and a women's team. Both currently play in British Universities and Colleges Sport (BUCS) leagues.

== History ==
The both sides play an annual varsity match against Glasgow University RFC .

Both the men's side and women's side teamed up with Glasgow Warriors to promote student rugby in 2019 in a one-year deal. This deal was later extended to 2022 and has since been renewed until at least the summer of 2029.

The university's Director of Rugby is Gary Strain, who had two spells at Glasgow Warriors as a player, and later helped out the Warriors as a scrum coach during the pandemic in the 2020–21 season. Strain commented on the deal:

The partnership and the rugby programme gives students the opportunity to train more like elite athletes, with much more professional sessions. Our new Strathclyde Sport facility has a fantastic gym with top quality strength and conditioning coaches who work hand in hand with me, so it lets the students improve as athletes. There's now a team of three coaches under me for the men's section and a head coach for the women, with 140 students in total and the eventual goal is to be the number one University in Scotland for rugby. There is a great culture of making friends and team sports is proven to have great benefits for health and mental wellbeing. Being a member of the team also hopefully makes university more of an enjoyable experience.

== Sides ==
The club runs a men's side and a women's side. The men's side operates a 1st, 2nd XV and 3rd XV.

Training is held at Stepps Playing Fields on Saturdays and once in the midweek TBC.

== Honours ==
=== Men ===
- 3A Scottish University Conference
  - Champions (2): 2004–05, 2012–13
- 2A Scottish University Conference
  - Champions (1): 2013–14
- Aberdeen University Sevens
  - Champions: 2022
