= Irvine F.C. =

Irvine F.C. may refer to:

- Irvine F.C. (1875), a former association football club from Irvine, North Ayrshire which existed from 1875–1881.
- Irvine F.C. (1877), a former association football club from Irvine, North Ayrshire which existed from 1877–1899.
- Irvine Meadow XI F.C., an association football club from Irvine, North Ayrshire which plays in the West of Scotland Football League.
- Irvine Victoria F.C., an association football club from Irvine, North Ayrshire which plays in the West of Scotland Football League.
- Irvine RFC, a rugby union club from Irvine, North Ayrshire.
