= Jilly McCord =

- Weight: 15 st (95 kg)
- Occupation: Teacher

Rugby union career
- Position: Lock
Amateur team(s)
Years	Team	Apps	(Points)
- Watsonians Ladies Rugby
–	Royal High Corstorphine RFC		
International career
Years	Team	Apps	(Points)
2002–?	Scotland		
- Correct as of 29 March 2017

Gillian McCord is a Scottish former rugby union player who played lock for Royal High Corstorphine RFC and Watsonians Ladies Rugby at a club level, and the Scotland women's national rugby union team. She made her debut as Scottish Captain against Canada in 2007. In 2019, she placed as a runner-up in the cooking competition show MasterChef.

== Playing career ==
During her rugby union playing career, Jilly McCord played as a lock. She initially played for Watsonians Ladies Rugby at club level.

In 2002, McCord was told that she would be unable to play for the Scotland women's national rugby union team unless she improved her pace by losing weight. She was playing for Royal High Corstorphine RFC at the time, and during the course of her weight loss, she lost 154 pounds (11.0 st) from a starting point of 25 stone (350 lb). Following her weight loss, she was selected for the national team. In 2007, she was named as Scottish captain, taking over from Donna Kennedy. Her first match as captain was against Canada, where she earned her 28th cap. She competed at the 2010 Women's Rugby World Cup.

== MasterChef ==
In 2019, she competed in the cooking television series MasterChef, where she reached the final, losing to Irini Tzortzoglou.

== Personal life ==
McCord lived in Inverkeithing, Fife, before moving to Cramond, Edinburgh, with her partner Kimberley Fergus and her two dachshunds. She works as a history teacher at Dollar Academy, a boarding school in Dollar, Clackmannanshire.
