= Queen Margaret University RFC =

Scottish rugby union club, based in Musselburgh

- Full name: Queen Margaret University Rugby Football Club
- Location: Musselburgh, Scotland
- Ground(s): Inch Park, Edinburgh
- Captain(s): (Scotland) Quinn Porter and Imogen Rose
- League(s): Men: BUCS Scottish men's tier 4 Women: BUCS Scottish women's tier 2
- 2023/24: Men: Did not compete Women: Did not compete
1st kit	2nd kit

Official website
- www.facebook.com/QMUwomensrugby/

Union website
- www.facebook.com/QMUmensRugby/

Queen Margaret University RFC is a rugby union club based in Musselburgh, Scotland. The club operates a men's team and a women's team. Both currently play in the university leagues.

== History ==
=== Men’s Rugby ===
The 2015/16 Scottish Conference 5A was won in spectacular fashion. Starting off the campaign with a tough 29-20 loss to Dundee and Angus College, the Queen Margaret Men's team bounced back and recorded 3 straight wins. Playing catch-up with Strathclyde 3XV for the majority of the season, QMU secured the league title in dramatic fashion; beating Strathclyde 3XV 35-0 at home and securing the title with a 10-10 draw at home to St Andrews 3XV in the final round of games. With both Queen Margaret and Strathclyde tied at 23 league table points each, QMU took 1st place on account of Points difference.

Pos	Team	Games					
Pos	Team	Pld	W	D	L	PD	TP
1	Queen Margaret	6	4	1	1	+91	23
2	Strathclyde	6	5	0	1	+44	23
3	Glasgow	6	4	0	2	+46	20
4	St Andrews	6	3	1	2	+60	19
5	West of Scotland	6	1	0	5	-145	5
6	Dundee and Angus	6	2	0	4	–1	0
7	GCU	6	1	0	5	–95	-5

The most notable season in recent years for the men’s side would be the 2018/19 season, when they went unbeaten in the Scottish Conference 4A league. Capping off such an achievement with a 43-7 away win to the 4XV of Edinburgh University RFC.

The Men's side train at 6pm-8pm on Mondays and 4pm-6pm on Wednesdays

=== Women’s Rugby ===
The QMU Women's team were established in 2016, when they played a series of friendly matches across the academic year.

Their first ever league games were in the 2017/18 season, when they joined the SRU leagues. Shortly before leaving and joining the BUCS leagues for the 2018/19 season.

In May 2021, the women's side journeyed by foot from Musselburgh to Murrayfield Stadium in Edinburgh carrying a medical stretcher to raise funds for the Heads for Change charity; and to raise awareness of concussion in rugby union.

The women's side train at 6.45pm to 8.15pm on Mondays at Inch Park.

=== Varsity ===
Every year towards the end of the season, both sides compete in varsity matches against Edinburgh Napier University RFC.

The reason why they play against Napier is due to the similar historic roots that the universities have. Both Institutions started off as colleges that specialised in certain skills, before merging and expanding with several other colleges around Edinburgh across the 20th century. Varsity is used as a way to celebrate the origins of both universities and promote local rivalry in all sports played within their doors.

== Honours ==
=== Men ===
- Scottish Conference 4A
  - Champions (2): 2010–11, 2018–19
- Scottish Conference 5A
  - Champions (2): 2009–10, 2015–16

== Notable former players ==
=== Men ===
==== Czechia ====
The following former Queen Margaret University RFC players have represented Czechia at senior international level.

- (Czech Republic) Martin Cimprich

==== Philippines ====
The following former Queen Margaret University RFC players have represented the Philippines at senior international level.

- (Philippines) Craig Wallace

=== Women ===
==== Ireland ====
The following former Queen Margaret University RFC players have represented Ireland at senior international level.

- (Ireland) Heather O'Brien

==== Royal Navy ====
The following former Queen Margaret University RFC players have represented The Royal Navy in senior rugby.

- (Scotland) Rowann Sinclair
