= Fraser MacAllister =

Scottish rugby union player

- Born: Fraser MacAllister c. 1908 Glasgow, Scotland
- Died: 2 March 1985 (aged 77) Edinburgh, Scotland

Rugby union career
Amateur team(s)
Years	Team	Apps	(Points)
- Shawlands FP
–	Clarkston		

95th President of the Scottish Rugby Union
- In office 1981–1982
- Preceded by: Cliff Wilton
- Succeeded by: George Thomson

Fraser MacAllister was a Scottish rugby union player, referee, and president of the Scottish Rugby Union. He played for Shawlands FP and Clarkston.

== Rugby union career ==
=== Amateur career ===
From 1923 to 1925, Fraser MacAllister played for two seasons as team captain at Shawlands Academy in Glasgow, Scotland. He also played for Shawlands FP and Clarkston. In 1932, he retired from professional rugby due to an injury.

=== Referee career ===
From 1933 to 1953, he worked as a referee in Glasgow.

=== Administrative career ===
Between 1930 and 1932, MacAllister served as the club secretary of Shawlands FP, and in 1935, he joined the committee of Glasgow District. He became vice president of the Scottish Rugby Union (SRU) in 1980.

In 1981, MacAllister became the 95th President of the Scottish Rugby Union, serving from 1981 to 1982, during which he launched the construction of the East Stand of Murrayfield Stadium for its re-development.

== Outside of rugby union ==
He was the manager of the Bible department at Collins Publishers.
