= Robert Gordon University RFC =

Scottish rugy union team

- Full name: Robert Gordon University Rugby Football Club
- Location: Aberdeen, Scotland
- League(s): Men: Caledonia North Non-League; Women: Scottish Womens Non-League
- 2024–25: Men: Caledonia North Non-League; Women: Scottish Womens Non-League
1st kit	2nd kit

Official website
- www.facebook.com/purpleshecobras

Union website
- www.facebook.com/rgurugbyclub

Robert Gordon University RFC is a rugby union club based in Aberdeen, Scotland. The club operates a men's team and a women's team. Both currently play in the university leagues.

== History ==
They play Aberdeen University RFC in a local derby match known as the Granite City Challenge.

== Sides ==
The men's team has a 1st and 2nd XV.

Both men and women train at the Woodside Sports Complex.

== Honours ==
=== Men ===
- Scottish Conference 2A
  - Champions (1): 2009-10
- Scottish Conference 3A
  - Champions (1): 2014-15
- Scottish Conference 3B
  - Champions (1): 2007-08

=== Women ===
- Scottish Conference 2A
  - Champions (1): 2016-17
