= Shawlands FP RFC =

Scottish rugby union club, based in Glasgow

(Scotland) Shawlands RFC
- Full name: Shawlands Rugby Football Club
- Union: Scottish Rugby Union
- Founded: 1906; 120 years ago
- Location: Glasgow, Scotland
- Region: West of Scotland
- Ground: Dumbreck (Capacity 2,000)
- President: (Scotland) Ed Crozier
- Coach(es): (England) Daniel Tams (Scotland) Tom Feasby
- Captain(s): (Scotland) Andrew Beverly (Scotland) Robert Kerr
- League: West Division Three
- 2019–20: West Division Three, 6th in Conf 2 <--Midlands conference-->
Team kit

Official website
- www.carthaqp.org

Shawlands RFC is an amateur rugby union side based on the south side of Glasgow and play at Dumbreck, the home of Cartha Queens Park RFC. Former Scottish Rugby Union President, Ed Crozier has played a vital role in recent years in bring the Shawlands XV back to competitive rugby, and served as the club president from 2017 to 2019, and then took on the role again in 2022.

== History ==
Shawlands acts as feeder club for Cartha Queens Park and train along with Cartha, under the supervision of Cartha head coach, Thomas Davidson, and Shawlands head coach, Daniel Tams.

They are currently playing in the West Division Three. The team missed out on promotion in the 15/16 season to Mull through points difference. In the 2017/18 Season, they reached the semi-final of the Western District bowl, losing out narrowly to Wigtownshire RFC, who went on to become runners up at Murrayfield for the Scottish Rugby Union Bowl 2017/18.

Their closest rivals include Hyndland RFC and Bishopton RFC, also playing in West Division Three.

Training takes place on Tuesday and Thursdays at 6:45pm, at Dumbreck.

== Shawlands Sharks ==
They also offer an opportunity for social rugby, with the Shawlands Sharks squad. The Sharks regularly play in friendly triangular competitions with the GHA Gazelles and Whitecraigs Rhynos. They also play regular matches against East Coast social sides, Dunfermline, and Edinburgh North rugby clubs.

The Sharks have also formed a close friendship with the Clayton Bootleggers Rugby Club, from North Carolina, USA, whom they played in 2019, with the Sharks coming out victorious 12–10.

== Notable former players ==
=== Glasgow District players ===
The following former Shawlands players have represented Glasgow District at provincial level.

- (Scotland) A. P. Fairlie
- (Uganda) Tony Nyangweso
- (Scotland) Torrence Gemmell
- (United States) Phil Nelson

=== International Caps ===
The following former Shawlands players have represented their countries at International Rugby level.

- (Uganda) Tony Nyangweso
- (Malta) Benjamin Borg
- (Malta) Bjorn Micallef
- (Serbia) Istok Totic
- (China) Gav Robertson

== Honours ==
- Bishopton Sevens
  - Champions: 2023
