= Alex Frew =

Scotland & South Africa dual-international rugby union player

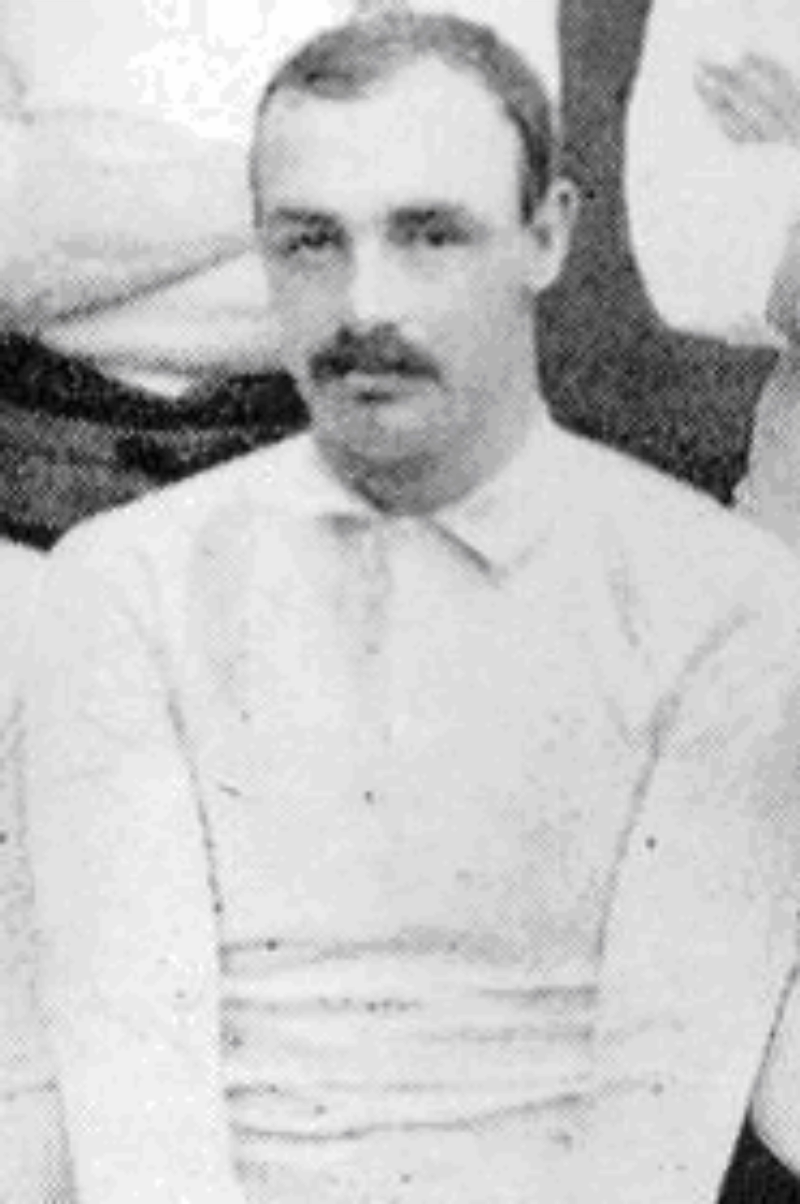
- Born: Alexander Frew; 24 October 1877 Newmilns, East Ayrshire, Scotland
- Died: 29 April 1947 (aged 69) Hout Bay, South Africa
- School: Spier's School, Beith
- University: Edinburgh University

Rugby union career
- Position: Forward
Amateur team(s)
Years	Team	Apps	(Points)
- Kilmarnock
–	Edinburgh University		
–	Diggers RFC		
Provincial / State sides
Years	Team	Apps	(Points)
- South-West
-	Glasgow District		
-	West Counties		
–	Transvaal Province		
International career
Years	Team	Apps	(Points)
1901	Scotland	3	(0)
1903	South Africa	1	(3)
- Correct as of 15 October 2007

Alex Frew (24 October 1877 – 29 April 1947) was an international rugby union forward who played for both Scotland and South Africa.

== Amateur career ==
He played for Kilmarnock RFC before moving to Edinburgh University.

He was capped by Scotland while at Edinburgh University RFC. He graduated as a doctor.

In South Africa, he played for Diggers RFC. He came to South Africa to work in a British-run concentration camp as a doctor.

== Provincial career ==
He was capped for the South-West District before being capped for Glasgow District to play in the 1899 Inter-city match against Edinburgh District.

While at Kilmarnock, he was also capped for West Counties District.

When he moved to South Africa he played for Transvaal province.

== International career ==
Frew played three tests for Scotland and one test for South Africa, captaining them on that one occasion

Sporting positions
Preceded by Fairy Heatlie	Springbok Captain; 1903	Succeeded by Jackie Powell
