= Alex Dunbar =

Scotland international rugby union player

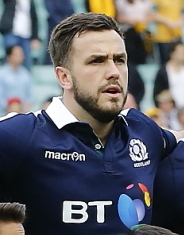
- Dunbar in 2017
- Born: Alexander James Dunbar; 23 April 1990 (age 36) Dumfries, Scotland
- Height: 1.91 m (6 ft 3 in)
- Weight: 103 kg (16 st 3 lb; 227 lb)
- School: Lockerbie Academy
- University: Scottish Agricultural College

Rugby union career
- Position: Centre
Amateur team(s)
| Years | Team | Apps | (Points) |
| 2006–08 | Annan | 38 | (130) |
| 2008–10 | Selkirk | 16 | |
| 2010-11 | Hawick | | |
| 2011-12 | Aberdeen GSFP | | |
| 2012-14 | Stirling County | | |
| 2014-18 | Glasgow Hawks | | |
| 2018-19 | Ayr | | |
Senior career
| Years | Team | Apps | (Points) |
| 2009–2019 | Glasgow Warriors | 119 | (85) |
| 2019 | → Newcastle Falcons | 4 | (0) |
| 2019–2020 | Brive | 12 | (5) |
- Correct as of 25 January 2020
International career
| Years | Team | Apps | (Points) |
| 2009–2010 | Scotland U20 | 15 | (5) |
| 2013–2018 | Scotland | 31 | (35) |
- Correct as of 29 January 2019

Alex Dunbar (born 23 April 1990) is a retired Scotland international rugby union player. His regular playing position was Centre.

== Rugby Union career ==
=== Amateur career ===
Born in Dumfries and a former pupil of Lockerbie Academy, Dunbar graduated in 2008 with an HNC from the Scottish Agricultural College at Auchincruive in Ayrshire.

Dunbar has appeared for Glasgow at every age level from under-14 to under-18 and was Annan rugby club under-18 player of the year in both 2005 and 2006 and the following season. He moved from Annan RFC to Selkirk RFC in 2008.

Dunbar was drafted to Glasgow Hawks in the Scottish Premiership for the 2017-18 season.

Dunbar was drafted to Ayr in the Scottish Premiership for the 2018-19 season.

=== Professional career ===
A Scottish Rugby Academy contracted player, Dunbar made his Glasgow Warriors debut in the 25–13 win against Ulster at Ravenhill in December 2009.

Dunbar was the only Scot (and only Scottish based player) to be included in the Rabodirect Pro 12 'Dream team' for the 2013–14 season. He agreed a new Glasgow contract until 2017 and helped Glasgow finish 2nd in the league. In January 2017 he signed a two-year contract extension.

On 2 September 2017, Dunbar played his 100th competitive match for the Warriors, in the first round of the Pro14 against Connacht. In January 2019, it was announced that Dunbar would spend the remainder of the season on loan at Newcastle Falcons and would then leave Warriors.

Dunbar signed a one-year contract for French Top 14 team CA Brive in June 2019. He was released by Brive in May 2020.

Due to ongoing injury issues, Dunbar announced his retirement in May 2021.

=== International career ===
Dunbar has played for Scotland at under-17, under-18 and under-20 level.

Dunbar won his first cap for the senior Scotland team in their opening match of the quadrangular tournament in South Africa in 2013, against Samoa and followed up the next week with his first try against South Africa in Nelspruit. He scored a second-half brace of tries as Scotland posted their first win in the 2014 RBS 6 Nations Championship by 21–20 against Italy in Rome.
