= Carrick RFC =

Scottish rugby union club

- Full name: Carrick Rugby Football Club
- Founded: 1978
- Location: Maybole, Scotland
- Ground(s): The Glebe
- League(s): West Division One
- 2019–20: Scottish National League Division Three, 12th of 12 (relegated)
Team kit

Official website
- www.carrickrugby.co.uk

Carrick RFC is a rugby union club based in Maybole, Scotland. The Men's team currently plays in West Division One.

== History ==
It was founded in 1978.

In April 2016 the club won the BT Shield beating Highland RFC in the final. They won the trophy the following two seasons, making them the first side to retain the trophy for 3 consecutive seasons.

In January 2021 the club became a registered charity. Charity number: (SCIO) SC050725

It was previously in the National League Division 3 in season 2019-20 but the SRU gave clubs the chance to move down leagues after the COVID-19 pandemic for the season 2021–22, if they wished, owing to individual circumstance caused by the pandemic.

(There were no leagues run in Scotland in 2020–21 season, outwith the Pro14 and international fixtures, due to COVID-19.)

Carrick took the opportunity to instead play in the top regional West league, rather than resume their place in National League 3; and effectively chose to be relegated.

== Sides ==
Carrick runs micro-mini, midi and senior sections.

== Honours ==
- BT Shield
  - Champions (1): 2015–16, 2016–17, 2017-18
- West Division 1
  - Champions (1): 2017-18
- Arran Sevens
  - Champions (1): 2014
