= Andrew Ross (rugby union, born 1904) =

British Lions & Scotland international rugby union player

Andrew Ross (born 8 November 1904) was a Scottish rugby union player who played international rugby for Scotland and the British Lions.

He played as hooker for Kilmarnock RFC and was capped for Scotland.

He toured with the 1924 British Lions tour to South Africa, playing in matches against Western Province, Western Province Universities and Rhodesia.
