= Dunfermline RFC =

Scottish rugby union club, based in Dunfermline

(Scotland) Dunfermline
- Full name: Dunfermline Rugby Football Club
- Union: Scottish Rugby Union
- Founded: 1893; 133 years ago
- Location: Dunfermline, Scotland
- Ground: McKane Park
- President: Greg Robertson
- Captain: Matthew Wilson
- League(s): Men: Scottish National League Division Four; Women: Scottish Women's Non-League
- 2025–26: Men: Scottish National League Division Four, 8th of 9 Women: Scottish Women's Midlands & East One
Team kit

Official website
- dunfermlinerugby.co.uk

Dunfermline Rugby Football Club is a rugby union club based in Dunfermline, Fife, Scotland. The men's team currently plays in Scottish National League Division Four, while the women's team currently plays in Scottish Women's Non-League.

== History ==
Established in 1893, home games are played at McKane Park.

Their strip is royal blue and white.

== Honours ==
=== Men's ===
- Scottish Unofficial Championship
  - Champions (1 + 1 shared): 1930–31, 1932-33 (with Hawick)
- Scottish National League Division 1 (fourth tier)
  - Champions: 2001-02
- Scottish National League Division 2 (fifth tier)
  - Champions: 2000-01
- Caledonia Region League Division 1
  - Champions: 2022-23
- Scottish Rugby Shield
  - Winners: 2011–12

==== Sevens ====
- Edinburgh Charity Sevens
  - Champions (2): 1931, 1938
- Lanarkshire Sevens
  - Champions (2): 1969, 1974
- Glasgow HSFP Sevens
  - Champions (1): 1929
- St. Andrews University Sevens
  - Champions (1): 1970
- Crieff Sevens
  - Champions (1): 1994
- Hillfoots Sevens
  - Champions (1): 1979
- Alloa Sevens
  - Champions (1): 1938
- Glenrothes Sevens
  - Champions (3): 1986, 1987, 1988
- Midlands District Sevens
  - Champions (11): 1925, 1928, 1966, 1967, 1969, 1971, 1973, 1974, 1975, 1979, 1986
- Musselburgh Sevens
  - Champions (2): 1967, 1975
- Kirkcaldy Sevens
  - Champions (7): 1967, 1969, 1973, 1986, 1987, 1991, 2019

== Notable players ==
=== Scotland internationalists ===
The following former Dunfermline players have represented Scotland at full international level.

- (Scotland) Jim Greenwood
- (Scotland) Harry Lind
- (Scotland) F. L. Osler
- (Scotland) Ron Glasgow
- (Scotland) Alfred Wilson
- (Scotland) Gus Black
- (Scotland) Murray McCallum
- (Scotland) L. R. Currie
- (Scotland) Rhea Clarke
- (Scotland) M. M. Henderson
- (Scotland) C. H. C. Brown
- (Scotland) Elliann Clarke

=== Notable non-Scottish players ===
The following is a list of notable non-Scottish international representative former Glasgow players:

Wales

- (Wales) Ronnie Boon

=== North and Midlands ===
The following former Dunfermline players have represented North and Midlands at provincial level.

- (Scotland) Ron Glasgow
- (Scotland) Jim Greenwood
- (Scotland) Tim Dunlop
- (Scotland) Sid Fowler

=== Glasgow Warriors ===
The following former Dunfermline players have represented Glasgow Warriors at professional level.

- (Scotland) Adam Nicol
- (Scotland) Fraser McKenzie

=== Edinburgh Rugby ===
- Murray McCallum - Edinburgh Rugby
- Fraser McKenzie - Edinburgh Rugby, Sale Sharks, Newcastle Falcons

=== Notable outside of rugby ===
- Michael Woodhouse, New Zealand Member of Parliament and Deputy Leader of the House

== See also ==
- Glenrothes RFC
- Howe of Fife RFC
- Kirkcaldy RFC
