= Ian Jardine =

Scotland international rugby union player and coach

- Born: Ian Carrick Jardine; 20 October 1964 (age 62) Dunfermline, Scotland
- Height: 6 ft 1 in (1.85 m)
- Weight: 94 kg (14 st 11 lb)
- Occupation: Rugby player

Rugby union career
- Position: Centre
Amateur team(s)
Years	Team	Apps	(Points)
- Stirling County
–	Cumnock		
Senior career
Years	Team	Apps	(Points)
1996–2001	Glasgow Warriors	41	(20)
Provincial / State sides
Years	Team	Apps	(Points)
- Glasgow District
International career
Years	Team	Apps	(Points)
1989-92	Scotland 'B'	3	(0)
1993-98	Scotland	18	

Ian Jardine (born 20 October 1964, in Dunfermline) is a former Scottish international rugby union player, normally playing at the Centre position.

== Rugby Union Career ==
=== Amateur career ===
His career spanned the amateur era and the professional era. He played for Stirling County.

Late in his career he played for Cumnock RFC.

=== Provincial and professional career ===
Jardine represented Glasgow District at various levels before finally representing the professional Glasgow side, now Glasgow Warriors. He made his debut for the Warriors away to Newport RFC in the European Challenge Cup on 26 October 1996, becoming Glasgow Warrior No. 27.

=== International career ===
He received three caps for Scotland 'B', the first on 9 December 1989 against Ireland 'B'.

He had his first international cap 20 November 1993 against New Zealand. He participated in the Five Nations tournaments of 1994-1996 and played for Scotland in the World Cup in 1995 (three games played, beaten in the quarterfinals).

=== Coaching career ===
He became coach of Stirling County RFC.
