= Stewartry RFC =

Scottish rugby union team

(Scotland) Stewartry RFC
- Full name: Stewartry Rugby Football Club
- Union: Scottish Rugby Union
- Founded: 19th July 1970; 55 years ago
- Location: Castle Douglas, Scotland
- Ground: Greenlaw
- President: Clare Dooley
- Director of Rugby: John Muir
- Coach: David Thompson
- League(s): Men: Scottish National League Division Four; Women: Scottish Womens West One
- 2024–25: Men: Scottish National League Division Four, 8th of 9 Women: Scottish Womens Premiership, 8th of 8 (relegated)
Team kit

Official website
- www.stewartryrugby.co.uk

Stewartry RFC is a rugby union side based in Castle Douglas, Dumfries and Galloway, Scotland.They field a Men's 1XV, Women's 1XV and 13 youth sides from 5 to 18 for both boys and girls. They play their home games at Greenlaw.

== History ==
There was a previous Stewartry rugby club, active in the 1920s. They played their last game in 1930. They played at Kirkchrist Park.

The present club was founded in 1970.

The Women's XV are known as the Stewartry Sirens. They are very successful; having won the National Plate competition on three occasions, as well as going undefeated in West Region Division 1 in 2022/23 to gain promotion into the Scottish Premiership.

The Men's XV play in the SRU National League 4. They have also had success in the cup competition winning the National Shield in 2022-23. They also play against Annan RFC for the Chisholm Cup; Wigtownshire Rugby Club for the Hanny Tully Cup; Newton Stewart for the Sandy Irving Memorial Trophy the local derby match.

Stewartry have a number of players who have gone on to represent Scotland. Notably Joe Ansbro (2010), Suzy Mckerlie-Hex (2013), Hannah Sloan (2015), Alex Craig (2021) and Stafford McDowell (2023). Stafford was named as co-captain for Scotland's win over Canada in Ottawa to open their 2024 summer tour. He was later named captain for Scotland's match against Portugal at Scottish Gas Murrayfield in November 2024.

== Stewartry Sevens ==
The club run the Stewartry Sevens. The Sevens tournament was founded in 1972.

== Notable former players ==
=== Men ===
==== Glasgow Warriors ====
The following former Stewartry players represented Glasgow Warriors.

- (Scotland) Stafford McDowall

==== Scotland ====
The following former Stewartry players represented Scotland.

- (Scotland) Joe Ansbro
- (Scotland) Alex Craig

- (Scotland) Stafford McDowell}

=== Women ===
==== Scotland ====
The following former Stewartry players represented Scotland.

- (Scotland) Lisa Ritchie
- (Scotland) Suzanne McKerlie-Hex (Rook)
- (Scotland) Hannah Sloan

== Honours ==
=== Women ===
- National Plate
  - Winners: 2014–15, 2016–17, 2018–19
- Hannah Tulley Cup
  - Winners: 2014–15
- West Division 1
  - Winners: 2022-23

=== Men ===
- Glasgow Division One
  - Winners: 1977-78
- National Division Five
  - Winners: 1991-92
- National Division Four
  - Winners: 1992-93
- Scottish National Shield
  - Winners: 2022-23
- Chisholm Cup
  - Winners: 2014-15
- Ardrossan Sevens
  - Winners: 1994
- Wigtownshire Sevens
  - Winners: 1994
- Stewartry Sevens
  - Winners: 1973, 1982

=== Youth ===
- West Regional U16 Plate:
- Winners: 2022
