= Dave McIvor =

Scottish rugby union player (born 1964)

- Born: David John McIvor; 29 June 1964 (age 62) Kirkcaldy, Scotland
- Height: 6 ft 1 in (1.85 m)
- Weight: 17 st 7 lb (111 kg)

Rugby union career
- Position: flanker
Amateur team(s)
Years	Team	Apps	(Points)
- Glenrothes
1988–96	Edinburgh Academicals		
1996	Glenrothes		
Senior career
Years	Team	Apps	(Points)
1996-98	Caledonia Reds		
Provincial / State sides
Years	Team	Apps	(Points)
- North and Midlands
International career
Years	Team	Apps	(Points)
1992–93	Scotland	6	(0)
1993–96	Barbarians	5	(0)
Coaching career
- Years: Team
- Edinburgh Academicals

David John McIvor (born 29 June 1964 in Kirkcaldy, Scotland) is a Scottish rugby coach who won six caps for Scotland playing as a flanker.

== Rugby Union career ==
=== Amateur career ===
McIvor began his rugby career with Glenrothes. He moved to Edinburgh Academicals in 1988.

In 1996, he moved back to play for Glenrothes.

=== Provincial and professional career ===
He captained North and Midlands in 1996 and played in the Scottish Inter-District Championship. When the North and Midlands side turned professional in 1996 he then played for Caledonia Reds.

He won the 1996–97 Scottish Inter-District Championship with Caledonia Reds, their first outright Inter-District title in their history.

=== International career ===
His debut for Scotland was at Murrayfield against England on 18 January 1992. His last international appearance was at Murrayfield against South Africa on 19 November 1994.

He made five appearances for Barbarians FC between 1993 and 1996.

=== Coaching career ===
He was a coach at Edinburgh Academicals. He became president of Edinburgh Academicals in 2015.
