= Alastair McHarg =

Scotland international rugby union player

- Born: Alastair Ferguson McHarg; 17 June 1944 (age 82) Irvine, Scotland
- Height: 6 ft 4 in (193 cm)
- Weight: 15 st (210 lb; 95 kg)
- School: Irvine Royal Academy
- Notable relative: John McHarg (brother)
- Occupation(s): Director of Rugby, Reading (since 2005)

Rugby union career
- Position: Lock
Amateur team(s)
Years	Team	Apps	(Points)
- Irvine
- West of Scotland
- London Scottish
- Sidmouth
Provincial / State sides
Years	Team	Apps	(Points)
- Anglo-Scots
-	Surrey		
International career
Years	Team	Apps	(Points)
1968-79	Scotland	44	
Coaching career
- Years: Team
- Sidmouth

Alastair McHarg (born 17 June 1944) is a former Scotland international rugby union player. He played at Lock for the national side between 1968 and 1979.

== Rugby Union career ==
=== Amateur career ===
Like Ian McLauchlan and Gordon Brown who were his contemporaries, McHarg was an Ayrshire man.

McHarg played for Irvine since his local club's formation in 1962, before going on to play for West of Scotland and London Scottish.

He trained and very occasionally played for Sidmouth RFC when not in use by Scottish.

=== Provincial career ===
McHarg played for Anglo-Scots and captained the side.

He also played for Surrey.

=== International career ===
McHarg won 44 caps for Scotland and also frequently partnered Gordon Brown in the Scottish second row.

Richard Bath writes of him that:

"At just over 15 stone and just 6ft. 4in., Alastair McHarg was hardly the identikit second row forward, even in the days when they didn't exactly breed 'em huge... A tough and notoriously abrasive Glaswegian, McHarg once joked that his entire playing career was shrouded 'in red mist'. McHarg though, fails to do himself justice with that remark... His speed around the park was perfectly suited to the mobile rucking game played by the Scots, whilst his timing and nous made him a safe bet at the line-out and one of the best number two jumpers of his generation."

Allan Massie says,

"He was probably the best line-out player Scotland have had. He timed his jump beautifully and could out-leap most of his contemporaries." – but was never selected for Lions.

Massie also valued his entertainment value as much as his skill.

"[o]f the famous Scottish front five of the early Seventies, Alastair McHarg was the card, the character, the most unorthodox, the greatest fun to watch. He was tall and rangy, a buoyant athlete, a little on the light side for a modern lock... His value in the broken play was incalculable."

Despite his skills, there were those who thought that McHarg would have been better as a Number 8.

=== Administrative career ===
McHarg has been the Director of Rugby at Reading since 2005.

=== Coaching career ===
He coached at Sidmouth RFC.

== Business career ==
McHarg still helps run his family business, Anglo Agriparts, selling classic tractor parts online.
