= Livingston RFC =

Scottish rugby union club, based in Livingston

(Scotland) Livingston RFC
- Full name: Livingston Rugby Football Club
- Founded: 1968
- Ground: Almond Park
- President: Lyn Turner
- Coach(es): Gavin Paul, Steven Bennett, John Bruton, Graham Steel, Paul McGrotty
- League(s): Men: East Division One; Women: Scottish Women's Midlands & East Two
- 2025–26: Men: East Division Two, 2nd of 7 (promoted); Women: Scottish Women's Midlands & East Two
Team kit	2nd kit

Official website
- www.pitchero.com/clubs/livingston

Livingston Rugby Football Club is a rugby union club based in Livingston, West Lothian, Scotland. The men's side currently compete in East Division One, the women's side currently compete in Scottish Women's Midlands & East Two.

== History ==
Established in 1968, as Livingston and District RFC, the team was founded through a local appeal for players by Jack Nixon, a native of Langholm, who in the 1960s was the Youth Officer of the West Lothian County Council. Among his responsibilities was to assistance in setting up clubs and organisations for the newcomers to Livingston. At the meeting, players from Bathgate RFC decided that amalgamating with the new Livingston side would allow them better opportunities for success and also give them a better chance of gaining a home ground, they had played previous games in Airdrie.

The team play their home games at Almond Park, located in the south-east of the town at Craigshill beside the River Almond and close to Mid Calder.

In 2013, Livingston reached the RBS National Shield final and played against Marr RFC at Murrayfield, the national stadium. They lost the match 30–15.

Livingston has an extensive youth section with teams ranging from Primary 1 all the way up to under-18 level.

In 2019, The development Livingston Ladies team reached the National Bowl Final and played against Greenock Wanderers at Murrayfield. They lost the match 72-12. Also in 2019 the ladies team application to compete in competitive fixtures got accepted and placed in the east region league.

== Livingston Sevens ==
The club run the Livingston Sevens tournament.

== New Town Sevens ==
This Sevens tournament was peripatetic around the new towns of Scotland:- East Kilbride, Glenrothes, Cumbernauld, Livingston and Irvine. The town's rugby clubs of East Kilbride RFC, Glenrothes RFC, Cumbernauld RFC, Livingston RFC and Irvine RFC would play in a Sevens tournament to become the New Town Sevens Champions and win the Scottish New Towns Cup.

== Honours ==
=== Men's ===
- Livingston Sevens
  - Champions (4): 1976, 1977, 1986, 1987
- New Towns Sevens
  - Champions (2): 1977, 1981
- Penicuik Sevens
  - Champions (1): 1988
- Edinburgh Northern Sevens
  - Champions (4): 1977, 1978, 1996, 1998
- Edinburgh District Sevens
  - Champions (1): 1978
- Grangemouth Cup
  - Champions: 1978

=== Women ===
National Bowl finalist 2019
