= Watsonians Ladies Rugby =

(Scotland) Watsonians FC Women
- Full name: Watsonian Football Club Women
- Union: Scottish Rugby Union
- Founded: 1998
- Location: Edinburgh, Scotland
- Ground: Myreside
- Coach: Bruce Millar / Gordy Lyons / Claire Bain
- Captain: Rachel Law
- League: Scottish Women's Premiership
- 2024–25: Scottish Women's Premiership, 3rd of 8
Team kit

Official website
- www.facebook.com/WatsonianLadiesRugby

Watsonian Women is a women's rugby union team based in Edinburgh and part of the Scottish Rugby Union. The club is part of Watsonians RFC and plays at the club's home ground of Myreside Road, Edinburgh.

== Squads ==
Watsonians Women play in the Scottish Premiership. In season 2023/24 they have also begun a girls section from u12 - u18 level called Watsonian Wildcats.

Formed in 1998 by a number of players from different clubs around the city, the team played in the Premier League for most of their existence and also in National 1- last winning that competition in the 2016/17 season. Following promotion to the Premiership again in 2017/18 Watsonians ladies have established themselves again at that level and in season 2017/18 were runners-up in the Sarah Beaney Cup.

=== Coaches ===
- 2013/14 - Baz Lawson
- 2014/15 - Baz Lawson and Freddie Main
- 2015/16 - Tristan Gray
- 2016/17 - Tristan Gray, Scott Nightingale, Euan Lyster
- 2017/18 - Tristan Gray, Scott Nightingale, Dave Flynn, Lindsey Booth
- 2018/19 - Dave Flynn, Scott Nightingale
- 2019/20 - Freddie Main, Scott Nightingale, Duncan Wilson, Lucy Brown
- 2020/21 - Freddie Main (no league)
- 2021/22 - Freddie Main, Scott Nightingale
- 2022/23 - Bruce Millar
- 2022/23 - Bruce Millar...
- 2023/24 - Bruce Millar, Claire Bain, Gordon
- 2024/25 - Bruce Millar, Claire Bain, Sarah Law
- 2025/26 Bruce Miller, Claire Bain, Sarah Law
- 2026/27 Bruce Miller, Sarah Law, Molly Wright

== Recent League History ==
- Season 2012/13 - 5th in Premier League
- Season 2013/14 - 6th in Premier League
- Season 2014/15 - 6th in National League 1 - Bowl Winners
- Season 2015/16 - 6th in National League 1 - Plate Winners
- Season 2016/17 - 1st in National League 1 - Cup Quarter Finalists
- Season 2017/18 - 5th in Premier League (1st In Prem B split) - Cup Finalists
- Season 2018/19 - 2nd in Premier League (1st In Prem A split)
- Season 2019/20 - 1st in Premier League (1st in Prem finals)
- Season 2020/21 - Cancelled by Covid-19 Pandemic
- Season 2021/22 - 1st in Premier League
- Season 2021/22 - 1st in Premier League
- Season 2022/23 - 3rd in Premier League
- Season 2023/24 - 1st in Premier League

== List of Watsonian Ladies Scotland Caps ==
Francesca McGhie - Molly Wright - Panashe Muzambe - Bryony Nelson - Lana Skeldon - Nicola Nightingale - Emma Evans - Karen Dunbar - Alex Pratt-- MP Tierney - Jilly McCord - Sarah Mee - Keri Holdsworth - Kath Vass, Sara Ebbett (nee Mears)

== Scotland 7s Internationalist Section ==
Bryony Nelson

== Honours ==
- Mull Sevens
  - Champions: 2019

== See also ==
- Rugby union in Scotland
- Scottish National League
- The Scottish 2nd XV League
- Scottish Women's Rugby
