= Heriot-Watt University RFC =

Scottish rugby union club, based in Edinburgh

- Full name: Heriot-Watt University Rugby Football Club
- Location: Edinburgh, Scotland
- League(s): Men: East Non-League; Women: Scottish Women's Non-League
- 2024–25: Men: East Non-League; Women: Scottish Women's Non-League
Team kit

Union website
- www.facebook.com/HWURFC

Heriot-Watt University RFC is a rugby union club based in Edinburgh, Scotland. The club operates a men's team and a women's team. Both currently play in the university leagues.

== History ==
Heriot-Watt University has a number of campuses in Scotland; and also one in Malaysia. Their Malaysian rugby union side are the Heriot-Watt Silverbacks.

The Heriot-Watt campus at Galashiels holds the Scottish Rugby Academy regional academy for the Borders and East Lothian.

== Sides ==
Women's training takes place on Tuesday evenings from 5pm to 6.30pm at the Sports Academy.

Men's training takes place on Monday and Thursday afternoons from 3.30pm and 4.30pm.

There are three men's XVs.

== Sevens ==
The Heriot-Watt University rugby side run the Heriot-Watt University Sevens tournament.

== Honours ==
=== Men ===
- Scottish Conference 2A
  - Champions (1): 2004-05
- Scottish Conference Cup
  - Champions (2): 2013–14, 2015
