= Iain Paxton =

British Lions & Scotland international rugby union player

- Born: Iain Angus McLeod Paxton; 29 December 1957 (age 68)

Rugby union career
- Position: No. 8
International career
Years	Team	Apps	(Points)
1981–1988	Scotland	40	(20)
1983	British Lions	4	(0)

Iain Angus McLeod Paxton (born 29 December 1957) is a Scottish former rugby union player. He won 36 caps for Scotland at number eight and lock between 1981 and 1988, scoring a total of five tries. He also won four caps for the British Lions against New Zealand in 1983.

== Playing career ==
=== Selkirk ===
Paxton's old playing club was Selkirk.

=== Scotland ===
Paxton made his Scotland debut against New Zealand All Blacks on the 1981 tour and later that year he helped Scotland to a memorable 24-15 win over Australia at Murrayfield. He was also a key figure in Scotland’s 1984 Grand Slam winning side, playing in all matches, relegating John Beattie to the bench.

When he finished his career in 1988, Paxton was Scotland's most capped No. 8 with 36 caps.

=== British Lions ===
Paxton was a member of the 1983 British Lions tour to New Zealand and played in all four internationals for the Lions.

=== Playing attributes ===
Richard Bath writes of him that:

"Against Wales in particular, Paxton was in superb form, scoring one of the greatest tries ever scored at Cardiff Arms Park as Scotland beat Wales at home for the first time since 1962."

== Coaching career ==
Paxton began his coaching career at Glenrothes RFC then moved to Boroughmuir, during which time the Meggetland outfit have lifted the SRU Cup twice (2000 and 2001) and taken the league title once (2002–03 season). He then went on to Coach the Scotland Under 21 team achieving a notable away victory over England. He went on to be appointed as forwards coach for Edinburgh Rugby. He returned to Club rugby with his old club Selkirk as Youth Development Manager In 2016, he was appointed as Director Of Rugby at Boroughmuir.
