= Bill Cuthbertson =

Scotland international rugby union player

- Born: William Cuthbertson; 6 December 1949 (age 76) Kilwinning, Scotland
- Occupation: housemaster

Rugby union career
- Position: lock
Amateur team(s)
Years	Team	Apps	(Points)
1980	Kilmarnock RFC		
1984	Harlequin F.C.		
Provincial / State sides
Years	Team	Apps	(Points)
- Glasgow District
International career
Years	Team	Apps	(Points)
1980	Scotland 'B'		
1980–84	Scotland	21	

William Cuthbertson (born 6 December 1949) is a former Scotland international rugby union player. He won twenty one caps for Scotland playing as a lock.

== Rugby Union career ==
=== Amateur career ===
In 1980 he played club rugby for Kilmarnock RFC. He went on to play for Harlequin F.C. He was also known by the nickname "Cubby".

=== Provincial career ===
He played for Glasgow District in Scottish Inter-District Championship.

=== International career ===
He was capped by Scotland 'B' twice in 1980.

Cuthbertson's first international match was against Ireland at Lansdowne Road on 2 February 1980, where he was one of five new caps. The last of his twenty one caps was against Australia at Murrayfield on 8 December 1984.

Between 1981 and 1984 he played eleven matches for Barbarians FC.

=== Coaching career ===
He worked as a housemaster and rugby coach at Seaford College, an independent school in West Sussex.
