= Glasgow University Medics RFC =

Rugby union club in Glasgow, Scotland

- Full name: Glasgow University Medics Football Club
- Founded: 2001
- Location: Glasgow, Scotland
- League(s): West Division Two
- 2019-20: West Division Three, 1st in Conf 2
Team kit

Official website
- www.facebook.com/medchirrfc/

Glasgow University Medics RFC is a rugby union club based in Glasgow, Scotland. The Men's team currently plays in West Division Two.

== History ==
The club was founded in 2001.

The Medics play in the Scottish Rugby Union leagues bur also take part in the SNIMS, the Scottish and Northern Irish Medic Sports.

For charity, in 2016, the team was trained in pole-dancing.

The referee Mike Adamson began his refereeing career with a match between the Medics and the Glasgow University Vets.

== Sides ==
The club runs a men's and women's side. Training is on Wednesday nights.

== Honours ==
=== Men's ===
- West Regional Bowl
  - Champions (1): 2018
- West 3 league champions
  - 2021/22
- SNIMS champions: 2019, 2020, 2021, 2022, 2023
