= Donna Kennedy =

- Full name: Donna Kennedy
- Born: 16 February 1972 (age 54)

Rugby union career
- Position: Back row
Senior career
Years	Team	Apps	(Points)
- Biggar
- Heriot Watt rugby
- Edinburgh Wanderers
- Leeds
- Edinburgh Accies
- Royal High Corstorphine
- Worcester Ladies
- Correct as of 2 January 2018
International career
Years	Team	Apps	(Points)
1993–2010	Scotland	115	
- Correct as of 2 January 2018
Coaching career
- Years: Team
- –2017: Worcester Valkyries
- Correct as of 2 January 2018

Donna Kennedy (born 16 February 1972) is a Scottish rugby union coach and former international player who played for the national team from 1993 to 2010. She was the world's most-capped women's player from 2004 to 2016 and the first Scottish player — woman or man — to reach 100 international caps. As of November 2017, she remains the most-capped player in Scotland with 115 caps.

Kennedy was named the IRB (Note: International Rugby Board, known since November 2014 as World Rugby.) International Women's Personality of the Year in 2004. In 2015, the Donna Kennedy Cup, an annual top-level women's rugby competition, was launched in her honour. In 2017, she was inducted into Scotland's Rugby Hall of Fame. Kennedy was inducted into the World Rugby Hall of Fame in 2024.

== Club rugby ==
Kennedy was born on 16 February 1972. She started playing rugby with Biggar RFC around 1991 aged 19. She then played for the Heriot Watt rugby team. In 1995, she played for Edinburgh Wanderers.

After playing for Leeds briefly, Kennedy returned to Scotland where she played for the Edinburgh Accies. The Accies became the Royal High Corstorphine and she played for them until 2004. She played for Worcester in 2005 and 2006.

== International career ==
In 1993, Kennedy made her debut in a match against Ireland in what was Scotland's first women's full-cap international. She played in the 1994 Women's Rugby World Cup that was hosted in Scotland. She was part of the first women's team to play on the main pitch at Murrayfield stadium in November 2012.

In February 2004, Kennedy 69th international match equalled the Scottish women’s record. She played on the wing early in the 2004 Women's Six Nations Championship despite normally playing as a number 8. In April 2004, she gained a 74th Scotland cap and became the world's most–capped woman rugby player, surpassing England's Gill Burns. Kennedy's 82nd cap equalled the Scottish record that Gregor Townsend had made for the men's team.

In September 2006, Scotland played their 100th match and finished sixth at the IRB Women's Rugby World Cup. Kennedy had played in 95 of Scotland’s matches and she intended to retire. She captained the side against Wales in February 2007. On 21 March 2007 she played in the final game of the 2007 Women's Six Nations Championship, gaining her 100th cap and becoming the first woman in the world and the first Scot of either gender to reach this total.

Kennedy played in 2010 Women's Rugby World Cup and scored a try against Sweden. She retired from international rugby in 2010. Her world record for the most international caps was surpassed by England's Rochelle Clark on 19 November 2016. As of November 2017, she remains the most-capped player in Scotland with 115 caps.

== Coaching ==
Kennedy was announced as the coach for the Scottish Women's Rugby Union Academy team in 2007. She became an assistant coach for the Scotland under-20 women's side in 2011. She subsequently became head coach at Women's Premiership side Worcester Ladies, and later became director of rugby as the club was renamed Worcester Valkyries. before announcing in February 2017 that she would step down from that role at the end of 2017.

== Honours ==
In 2004, Kennedy was awarded the IRB International Women's Personality of the Year.

The Donna Kennedy Cup, an annual Scottish women’s rugby cup competition, was named in her honour starting in 2015. The annual event was launched with a team selected from Glasgow and Caledonia players taking on a select side from Edinburgh and the Borders.

In November 2017, Kennedy was inducted into the Scottish Rugby Hall of Fame. The Scotland national team awards a trophy in her name.

Kennedy was inducted into the World Rugby Hall of Fame in 2024.
