= Dundee University RFC =

Scottish rugby union club, based in Dundee

- Full name: Dundee University Rugby Football Club
- Location: Dundee, Scotland
- Ground(s): Dundee University playing fields, Riverside
- League(s): Men: Caledonia Midlands Non-League; Women: Scottish Womens Non-League
- 2024–25: Men: Caledonia Midlands Non-League; Women: Scottish Womens Non-League
| 1st kit | 2nd kit |

Dundee University RFC is a rugby union club based in Dundee, Scotland. The club operates a men's team and a women's team. Both currently play in the university leagues.

== History ==
Recently the men's side has had international players from Turkey and the Cayman Islands in their ranks. Another player Neil McComb played for Ireland Under 21 and Ulster Rugby.

The men's side are raising money for the Oddballs charity during the Lions tour of South Africa.

The Men's 1st XV won the BUCS national trophy in 2023 by defeating Brunel 2nd XV 50-33 in the final. This topped off a cup run consisting of wins in the following games: defeating Edinburgh 2nd XV 29-12 in the first round, then Loughborough 4th XV 38-32 in the second round, which set up a big game against Doncaster 1st XV, eventually defeating them 24-19 to send them into the quarter final down in Leeds to face Leeds Beckett 2nd XV, who Dundee beat 42-7. This set up a semi-final against fellow scots Strathclyde 1st XV in Glasgow. Dundee won the game 16-14 with a last minute penalty to secure them a place in the final down in Nottingham for BUCS Big Wednesday, where they defeated Brunel 2nd XV to claim the club's first piece of British silverware since the 1980s. The team was captained by Ultach Bradley McNamara.

== Sides ==
The men's side runs 3 XVs.

== Honours ==
=== Men ===
- Scottish University Sevens
  - Champions (1): 1994
- Scottish Conference 1A
  - Champions (2): 2007–08, 2011–12
- Scottish Conference 2A
  - Champions (2): 2005–06, 2010–11
- BUCS National Trophy Champions 2023

=== Women ===
- Scottish Conference 1A
  - Champions (5): 2007–08, 2008–09, 2009–10, 2011–12, 2012–13
- Mull Sevens
  - Champions (1): 2008
