= Euan Ferrie =

Scottish rugby union player (born 2001)

- Born: 23 July 2001 (age 25) East Kilbride, Scotland
- Height: 6 ft 6 in (1.98 m)
- Weight: 104 kg (229 lb; 16 st 5 lb)
- School: Calderglen High School

Rugby union career
- Position: Flanker / Lock
Amateur team(s)
Years	Team	Apps	(Points)
-	East Kilbride		
-	Hamilton		
-	Glasgow Hawks		
Senior career
Years	Team	Apps	(Points)
2021-	Glasgow Warriors	50	(20)
Super Rugby
Years	Team	Apps	(Points)
2021-	Boroughmuir Bears		
International career
Years	Team	Apps	(Points)
-	Scotland U19		
2021	Scotland U20	5	(0)
2026	Scotland 'A'	1	(0)

Euan Ferrie (born 23 July 2001) is a Scotland 'A' international rugby union player who plays for Glasgow Warriors in the United Rugby Championship. He plays at Flanker and Lock.

== Rugby Union career ==
=== Amateur career ===
Ferrie came through the school ranks at Calderglen High School of St Leonards, East Kilbride and then played for East Kilbride.

He then moved to play for Hamilton Bulls; and then moved again to play for Glasgow Hawks.

=== Professional career ===
He joined the Scottish Rugby Academy as a Stage 3 player in season 2021-22 and was assigned to Glasgow Warriors.

He was also placed in the Boroughmuir Bears squad for the Super 6 season.

He played for Glasgow Warriors against Ayrshire Bulls on 2 September 2022 in the pre-season match at Inverness.

He made his competitive debut for the Glasgow side in the United Rugby Championship against Benetton Rugby, nearly scoring a debut try moments after taking the field. He became Glasgow Warrior No. 347.

He followed that up in the next round match against Leinster at the RDS Arena.

He made his European debut for Glasgow against Bath Rugby in the 2022–23 EPCR Challenge Cup, in a 22 - 19 win for the Warriors.

He signed out of the academy on 23 January 2023 by agreeing a professional contract with Glasgow Warriors. He won Warrior of the Month in September 2023.

=== International career ===
He played for Scotland U19.

Ferrie played for Scotland U20 in 2021.

He played for Scotland 'A' on 6 February 2026.
