= George Thomson (rugby union, died 2005) =

Scottish rugby union player

GeorgeThomson
- Born: George W. Thomson
- Died: 2005

Rugby union career
- Position: Hooker
Amateur team(s)
Years	Team	Apps	(Points)
-	Watsonians		

96th President of the Scottish Rugby Union
- In office 1982–1983
- Preceded by: Fraser MacAllister
- Succeeded by: Adam Robson

George Thomson was a Scottish rugby union player. He was the 96th President of the Scottish Rugby Union.

== Rugby Union career ==
=== Amateur career ===
He played for Watsonians. He played sevens for Watsonians in the 1946 Jed-Forest Sevens.

He played for a Scottish Services XV in 1944.

=== Administrative career ===
Thomson became the 96th President of the Scottish Rugby Union. He served the standard one year from 1982 to 1983.

== Military career ==
He was a sub-Lieutenant in the Second World War. He won a Distinguished Service Cross for his work on Arctic convoys.

== Death ==
Thomson died in 2005.

Jim Telfer described Thomson as 'the father of (rugby union) coaching in Scotland'. He went to say:

We lost a great man when George died in 2005. It was his enthusiasm of developing a professional, cutting edge to rugby coaching that inspired me. Intriguingly he was fanatical about the development of the ruck as part of the Scottish armoury and, believe it or not, occasionally I had to dampen down his enthusiasm.
