= Glenrothes RFC =

Scottish rugby union club, based in Glenrothes

Coordinates: 56.19147°N 3.14132°W

Glenrothes
- Full name: Glenrothes Rugby Football Club
- Union: Scottish Rugby Union
- Nickname: The Glens
- Founded: 1965; 60 years ago
- Location: Glenrothes, Scotland
- Ground: Carleton Park
- League: Caledonia Midlands Division Two
- 2024–25: Caledonia Midlands Division Two, 6th of 9
Team kit

Official website
- www.glenrothesrugby.co.uk

Glenrothes RFC is a rugby union club based in Glenrothes, Fife, Scotland. Home matches are played at Carleton Park, Glenrothes.

== History ==
Founded in 1965, the club celebrated its 50th anniversary in 2015.

Glenrothes currently competes in Caledonia Midlands Division Two.

== Glenrothes Sevens ==
The club run the Glenrothes Sevens tournament.

== New Town Sevens ==
This Sevens tournament was peripatetic around the new towns of Scotland:- East Kilbride, Glenrothes, Cumbernauld, Livingston and Irvine. The town's rugby clubs of East Kilbride RFC, Glenrothes RFC, Cumbernauld RFC, Livingston RFC and Irvine RFC would play in a Sevens tournament to become the New Town Sevens Champions and the Scottish New Towns Cup.

== Honours ==
- Glenrothes Sevens
  - Champions: 1981, 1982, 1984, 1995
- Strathmore Sevens
  - Champions: 1977
- New Towns Sevens
  - Champions: 1972, 1974, 1976, 1978
- Dumbarton Sevens
  - Champions: 1991
- Waid Academy F.P. Sevens
  - Champions: 1976, 1979, 1987
- Alloa Sevens
  - Champions: 1991
- Midlands District Sevens
  - Champions: 1977, 1978, 1981, 1982
- Kirkcaldy Sevens
  - Champions: 1978, 1979, 1983
- Howe of Fife Sevens
  - Champions: 1976, 1978, 2000

== Notable former players ==
=== British and Irish Lions ===
- (Scotland) Iain Paxton

=== Scotland internationalists ===
- (Scotland) Dave McIvor
- (Scotland) Iain Paxton

=== Caledonia Reds players ===
- (Scotland) Dave McIvor
- (Scotland) Jonathan Goldie

=== Edinburgh Rugby players ===
- (Scotland) Sean Crombie
- (Scotland) Dave Young

== See also ==
- Dunfermline RFC
- Howe of Fife RFC
- Kirkcaldy RFC
