= Loch Lomond RFC =

Scottish rugby union football club

Loch Lomond Rugby Club
- Union: Scottish Rugby Union
- Founded: 1996
- Location: Bonhill, Scotland
- Ground(s): Dillichip playing fields
- League(s): West Division Three
- 2019–20: West Division Three, 1st in Conf 1
Team kit

Official website
- www.lochlomondrugbyclub.co.uk

Loch Lomond Rugby Club is a small Scottish rugby union club that plays in the West Division Three.

The club was formed in 1996 when Dumbarton and Vale of Leven Rugby Clubs merged in order to increase playing numbers and to pool finances.

The club has a clubhouse and playing / training facilities at its base in Bonhill, 25 miles west of Glasgow and runs a 1st and 2nd XV together with a junior section.

While most of Loch Lomond's short history has been spent trying to stay afloat financially, they have achieved three promotions (2nd place Glasgow District League Division 2 in 1999–00, 2nd place Glasgow District League Division 1 in 2000–01 and as champions of BT National Division 5 West (B) in 2005–06) and one relegation (from BT National League 5 West (A) in 2004–05). They also reached the last-eight of the BT Bowl in 2000–01, and again in 2007–08.

== Achievements ==
- BT National League 5 West (B):
  - Winners : 2005–06
- Glasgow District League Division 1:
  - Runners up : 2000–01
- Glasgow District League Division 2:
  - Runners up :1999–00
- BT Bowl:
  - Quarter Final : 2000–01
  - Quarter Final : 2007–08

== Notable former players ==
=== Glasgow Warriors players ===
- (Scotland) Duncan Munn
