= Hamilton RFC =

Scottish rugby union club, based in Hamilton

(Scotland) Hamilton RFC
- Full name: Hamilton Rugby Club
- Union: Scottish Rugby Union
- Nickname: The Bulls
- Founded: 1927; 99 years ago
- Location: Hamilton, Scotland
- Ground: Laigh Bent
- President: Stephen Wright
- Director of Rugby: Kevin McCann
- Coach: Gary McKinven (Head Coach) Andy Hill (Defence Coach) Owen McLeish (Attack Coach) Scott Whitelaw (Assistant coach/Analysis) Ben Addison (2nd XV Coach)
- Captain: Scott Alexander
- League: Men: Scottish National League Division Four
- 2025–26: Men: Scottish National League Division Four, 5th of 9
Team kit

Official website
- www.hamiltonrugbyclub.co.uk

Hamilton Rugby Football Club is a rugby union club based in Hamilton, South Lanarkshire, Scotland.

== History ==
Established in 1927 as Hamilton Academy FP (former pupils) rugby club, they play their home games at Laigh Bent. The men's side currently compete in Scottish National League Division Four; and the women's side currently compete in Scottish Women's West Two. Hamilton Rugby Club was chosen as Scottish Rugby's Club of the Year for the season 2017-2018 having been runner-up in 2014/15. The Bulls received the honour of BT Club of the Month for October 2014. At the end of that same season, the club received a further honour by being named as Glasgow Warriors, 'Greenbelt Community Club of the Season' at the Warriors' end of season dinner.

The Club invests heavily in Youth Development and boasts age group teams from Primary 1 through to under-18. The club's under-18 squad is one of only 16 teams in Scotland to regularly qualify for the National U18 cup competition. In 2009, Hamilton RFC signed an agreement allowing British American Football League side The East Kilbride Pirates to play their home fixtures at Laigh Bent. This agreement ended in 2018.[For history of Laigh Bent playing fields, see article Hamilton Academy].

In season 2022-23 playing in National League 2, Hamilton RFC finished last and bottom of the league and were consequently relegated.

== Hamilton Sevens ==
The club run the Hamilton Sevens tournament.

It is also one of the clubs that hosts the Lanarkshire Sevens.

== Notable players ==
=== Glasgow Warriors ===
The following former Hamilton players have represented Glasgow Warriors at professional level.

- (Scotland) Euan Ferrie
- (Scotland) Craig Sangster
- (Scotland) Gerry Hawkes
- (Scotland) Richard Maxton
- (Scotland) Jonny Gray

== Honours ==
=== Club ===
- Club of the Year
  - Champion (1): 2017–18
- Glasgow Warriors Community Club of the Season
  - Champions: 2014–15

=== Men's ===
- Scottish National League Division Two
  - Champions (3): 2005–06, 2007–08, 2015–16
- Lanarkshire Sevens
  - Champions (6): 1962, 1963, 1965, 1966, 1967, 1968
- Hyndland Sevens
  - Champions (1): 1963
- Mull Sevens
  - Champions (2): 2014, 2015
- Clydesdale Sevens
  - Champions (1): 1990
- Drumpellier Sevens
  - Champions (2): 1973, 1980
- Wigtownshire Sevens
  - Champions (2): 1966, 1968
- Edinburgh Northern Sevens
  - Champions (1): 2008
