= Benetton Treviso =

Benetton Treviso may refer to either of the following sports clubs in Treviso, Italy, both owned by clothing giant Benetton:

- Benetton Rugby, an Italian rugby union club that participates in the Pro14
- Pallacanestro Treviso, a basketball club usually referred to as Benetton Treviso by basketball media in the English-speaking world
