= Paisley RFC =

Scottish rugby union club, based in Paisley

(Scotland) Paisley Rugby Football Club
- Full name: Paisley Rugby Football Club
- Union: Scottish Rugby Union
- Founded: 1982
- Location: Paisley, Scotland
- Region: Renfrewshire
- Ground: The Anchor Recreational Ground
- President: Gavin Newlands
- Coach: Grant Sweenie
- Captain(s): Jack Valentine & Meena Patel
- Top scorer: (Scotland) Euan Stuart
- League: West Division 3
- 2024-25: 4th
1st kit	2nd kit

Official website
- www.paisleyrugby.org.uk

Paisley Rugby Club is a Scottish rugby union club, based at the Anchor Recreation Grounds in Paisley, Scotland. The club is currently in the West Regional League West Three.

The club runs both senior Men & Women sections, a host of youth teams along with a mixed touch section. The senior men's squad is led by Head Coach Grant Sweenie.

With a mix of youth and experience, Paisley's 1st XV are an established team in West Regional League West Three. Paisley finished 4th in the season 2024/25 in West Division 3
