= Wigtownshire RFC =

Scottish rugby union team

- Full name: Wigtownshire Rugby Football Club
- Union: Scottish Rugby Union
- Founded: 1922; 103 years ago
- Location: Stranraer, Scotland
- Ground(s): London Road Playing Fields
- President: Campbell McGregor
- Coach(es): Paul Philips
- League(s): Men: West Division Two; Women: Scottish Womens West One
- 2019–20: Men: West Division Two, 6th of 10; Women: Scottish Womens West One
Team kit

Wigtownshire RFC is a rugby union side based in Stranraer, Dumfries and Galloway, Scotland. They run a Men's XV and a Woman's XV.

== History ==
Wigtownshire play Newton Stewart in their local derby for the Spice Cup.

Jessie Helen Ferguson won a M.B.E in the 1996 New Years Honours List for services to Wigtownshire Rugby Football Club.

London Road was to host Glasgow Warriors match against Ulster Rugby on 31 July 1999.

The club reached the final of the National Bowl in 2018.

== Wigtownshire Sevens ==
Wigtownshire run the Wigtownshire Sevens tournament.

== Notable former players ==
=== Outside of rugby ===
The following former Wigtownshire players are notable outside of rugby

- (Scotland) John Scott, former Scottish MSP

== Honours ==
- Wigtownshire Sevens
  - Champions: 1956, 1960, 1967, 1969, 1988, 1990, 1991, 1995, 1996
- West Three
  - Champions: 2018
- Dumfries Sevens
  - Champions: 1974, 1975, 1990
- Cumnock Sevens
  - Champions: 1990
- Stewartry Sevens
  - Champions: 1978, 1979, 1988, 1992
- Ayr Sevens
  - Champions: 1996
