= Clydebank RFC =

Scottish rugby union club

(Scotland) Clydebank RFC
- Full name: Clydebank Rugby Football Club
- Union: Scottish Rugby Union
- Founded: 1969; 57 years ago
- Location: Clydebank, Scotland
- Ground: Clydebank Community Sport Hub
- League: West Division Three
- 2025–26: West Division Three, 5th of 8
Team kit

Clydebank RFC is a rugby union side based in Clydebank, West Dunbartonshire, Scotland. The club was founded in 1969. They play their home games at Dean Street in the Clydebank Community Sports Hub; a purpose built facility which opened in 2018, featuring several rugby pitches.

== History ==
Three rugby enthusiasts in 1969 regularly met at a local garage in Hardgate, near Clydebank; and other rugby minded locals then followed suit. Deciding to play for a local team they turned out for a Dumbarton club which was temporarily short of players - but when the Dumbarton regulars returned the Clydebank enthusiasts were dropped. It was then that they decided to form a Clydebank side.

The club was formally founded on 24 May 1969 at the Radnor Hotel in Clydebank. The first game on 1 September 1969 was a friendly played against a Presidents XV. The local Hardgate garage owner, Kinloch Campbell, supplied a 'ringer' for Clydebank RFC; his cousin was the Scotland international Dick Allan and he dutifully scored the club's first try. However the slender lead did not last and the Presidents XV won easily.

=== Whitecrook complex ===
The Whitecrook Sports Centre was a 3.1 Million pounds initiative:- the Scottish Government directly giving 1 Million pounds, West Dunbartonshire Council providing 850,000 pounds; Sport Scotland with 500,000 pounds; and the Gaelic Athletic Association with 300,000 pounds, being the biggest contributors. The Glasgow Gaels, a gaelic football side, along with Kilpatrick F.C. and the local Clydebank Taekwon Do club are other users of the Sports complex. The final cost for the project, which now has one of the largest 3G pitches in Europe, was estimated at 4 Million pounds.

Gregor Townsend took the Scotland international team training at Whitecrook on 13 February 2019,

== Clydebank Tens ==
The club host an annual rugby Tens tournament.

== Notable former players ==
- Ross McCombe

=== Scotland ===
The following former Clydebank players represented Scotland.

- (Scotland) Dick Allan

== Honours ==
- Clydebank Tens
  - Champions: 2020
- Dumbarton Sevens
  - Champions: 1992
- Helensburgh Sevens
  - Champions: 1987
