= Ardrossan Academicals RFC =

Scottish rugby union club, based in Ardrossan

Ardrossan Academicals
- Full name: Ardrossan Academicals Rugby Football Club
- Union: Scottish Rugby Union
- Founded: 1921; 105 years ago
- Location: Ardrossan, Scotland
- Ground: Memorial Field
- League(s): Men: Scottish National League Division Four; Women: Scottish Womens Non-League
- 2024–25: Men: Scottish National League Division Four, 2nd of 9 Women: Scottish Womens West One
Team kit

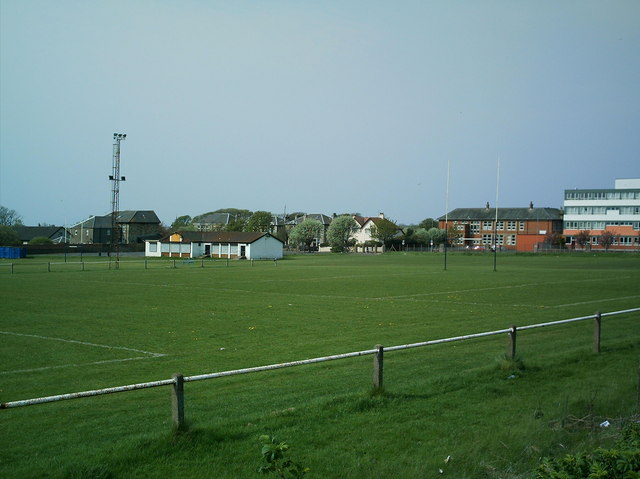

Ardrossan Academicals is a rugby union team from Ardrossan, North Ayrshire. The men's side play in the Scottish National League Division Four; the women's side play in the Scottish Womens Non-League. The team's home ground is Memorial Field, across the road from Ardrossan Academy.

== History ==
Two previous rugby union sides started in Ardrossan in 1870. The Ardrossan Castle Foot-Ball Club began playing at the practice ground at Clutha Park before moving to the Castle grounds. Its local rival was the Ardrossan Football Club that played on the Clutha Park practice ground. The Ardrossan Football Club was rugby union until it made the switch to association football in 1874; but only lasted another two years as an association side. The Ardrossan Castle Foot-Ball Club remained rugby union until around 1880. It switched to association football, dropping the hyphen in its name on making the switch.

The present club was founded in 1921.

In 2005, they won the BT Bowl by beating Greenock.

== Ardrossan Sevens ==
The club run the Ardossan Sevens tournament. The men's competition began in 1954 and sides play for the Past Players Trophy. A woman's competition was started in 2016.

== Honours ==
- Ardrossan Sevens
  - Champions: 1954, 1955, 1960, 1961, 1976
- Cambuslang Sevens
  - Champions: 1979
- Wigtownshire Sevens
  - Champions: 1975
- Stirling Sevens
  - Champions: 1972

== Notable former players ==
=== Glasgow District ===
The following former Ardrossan Academicals players have represented Glasgow District at provincial level.

- (Scotland) W. Fraser
