= Annan RFC =

Scottish rugby union club, based in Annan

(Scotland) Annan RFC
- Full name: Annan Rugby Football Club
- Union: Scottish Rugby Union
- Founded: 1968/69
- Location: Annan, Scotland
- Ground(s): Violetbank, Annan
- President: (Scotland) Neil Moffat
- Coach: Juan Phyfer
- Captain: Ryan Glass
- League(s): Men: West Division One; Women: Scottish Womens West Two
- 2024–25: Men: West Division One, 8th of 10; Women: Scottish Womens West Two, 2nd of 6
Team kit

Official website
- annanrugby.com

Annan Rugby Football Club are a rugby union side based in Annan in Dumfries and Galloway, Scotland. The men's side play in West Division One, the women's side play in Scottish Womens West Two.

== History ==
Originally established in 1879, the current club was restarted in 1968. Becoming formally affiliated with the SRU in 1969.

A former member of the Border League and Glasgow District League, the Annan men's side currently play in West Division One; the Annan women's side currently play in Scottish Womens West Two.

In 2016 they were awarded BT Club of the Season.

The club captain for season 2019–20 is Andrew Jancey.

== Sides ==
Annan Rugby Club hosts a number of teams.

The Teams are:

- 1st XV
- 2nd XV
- Ladies XV (The Warriors)
- U18 Girls XV (The U18 Hornets)
- U15 Girls XV (The U15 Hornets)
- U18 Boys XV
- U15 Boys XV
- U14 Boys XV
- U13 Boys XV

Plus numerous teams from Primary 1 onwards (girls and boys)

== Honours ==
=== Club ===
- BT Club of the Season
  - Champions (1): 2016

=== Men's ===
- Regional League West 2
  - Champions (2): 2012–13, 2015–16
- SRU BT Bowl
  - Champions (1): 2002–03
- National League Division 2
  - Champions (1): 1997–98
- National League Division 3
  - Champions (1): 1996–97
- National League Division 4
  - Champions (1): 1995–96
- National League Division 6
  - Champions (1): 1994–95
- National League Division 7
  - Champions (1): 1993–94
- Glasgow District League Division 1
  - Champions (1): 1992–93
- Glasgow District League Division 2
  - Champions (1): 1991–92
- Selkirk Junior Sevens
  - Champions (1): 2002
- Stewartry Sevens
  - Champions (4): 1981, 1984, 1993, 1994

=== Women's ===
- Women's National Division 1
  - Champions (1): 2017-18
- Biggar Sevens
  - Champions (1): 2018
- Wigtownshire Sevens
  - Champions (2): 1999, 2000

== Notable former players ==
=== Men ===
==== Scotland ====
The following former Annan RFC players have represented Scotland.

- (Scotland) Alex Dunbar
