= Bishopton RFC =

Scottish rugby union club, based in Bishopton

(Scotland) Bishopton RFC
- Full name: Bishopton Rugby Football Club
- Union: Scottish Rugby Union
- Founded: 1994; 32 years ago
- Location: Bishopton, Scotland
- Ground: Holmpark
- League(s): Men: West Division Three; Women: Scottish Womens West One
- 2019–20: Men: West Division Three, 3rd in Conf 2 Women: Scottish Womens West Two, 1st of 6 (promoted)

Bishopton RFC is a rugby union side based in Bishopton, Renfrewshire, Scotland. The men's side currently play in West Division Three; the women's side currently play in Scottish Womens West One.

== History ==
The club was founded in 1994.

They play their home games at Holmpark, formerly the Royal Ordnance Factory playing fields. The club's crest reflects that Ordnance history.

Bishopton Community Trust received a cheque for £300,000 from British Aerospace to help develop the sporting infrastructure at Bishopton including the Bishopton rugby clubhouse and pitches. The club are now looking to develop a 3G pitch. The club has built new clubhouse facilities.

The rugby club has its own tartan, which was designed to celebrate the club's Silver anniversary.

== Sides ==
The club runs two senior XV men's sides; and junior sides for boys and girls. The club has also launched a women's side.

== Notable former players ==
- (Scotland) Matthew Seymour - deceased former player. A crowd-funder campaign to get the club a defibrillator raised over £1400 to allow its purchase. A memorial fund has been set-up in his name.
