= East Kilbride RFC =

Scottish rugby union club, based in East Kilbride

(Scotland) East Kilbride RFC
- Full name: East Kilbride Rugby Football Club
- Union: Scottish Rugby Union
- Founded: 1968/69; 1996 years ago
- Location: East Kilbride, Scotland
- Ground: Torrance House
- President: Bruce Beggins
- Captain: Mark Ellison
- League: West Division One
- 2024–25: West Division One, 5th of 10
Team kit

East Kilbride RFC are a rugby union side who are based in East Kilbride.

== History ==
Established in 1968, their home games are played at the Torrance House ground within Calderglen Country Park. The team currently compete in the West Division One.

EKRFC moved to the Torrance Arena in 1971, which led to steady progress through the divisions, which finally saw them spend 3 seasons in Premier 2 and winning the BT shield.

== East Kilbride Sevens ==
The club run the East Kilbride Sevens.

== New Town Sevens ==
This Sevens tournament was peripatetic around the new towns of Scotland:- East Kilbride, Glenrothes, Cumbernauld, Livingston and Irvine. The town's rugby clubs of East Kilbride RFC, Glenrothes RFC, Cumbernauld RFC, Livingston RFC and Irvine RFC would play in a Sevens tournament to become the New Town Sevens Champions and the Scottish New Towns Cup.

== Notable players ==
=== Glasgow Warriors ===
The following former East Kilbride players have represented Glasgow Warriors at professional level.

- (Scotland) Euan Ferrie
- (Scotland) John Shaw
- (Scotland) Colin Stewart
- (Scotland) Fraser Stott

=== Scotland ===
The following former East Kilbride players have represented Scotland.

- (Scotland) Alasdair Strokosch

== Honours ==
- West Region Shield
  - Champions (1): 2019
- Glasgow City Sevens
  - Champions (1): 1998
- New Towns Sevens
  - Champions (1): 1975, 1982
- East Kilbride Sevens
  - Champions (1): 1985
- Lanarkshire Sevens
  - Champions (1): 1987
- Helensburgh Sevens
  - Champions: 1976, 1978, 1980, 1985
- Hamilton Sevens
  - Champions: 1986
- Cambuslang Sevens
  - Champions: 1989
- Glasgow Warriors Community Club of the Season
  - Champions: 2016-17
