= Corstorphine RFC =

Scottish rugby union club, based in Corstorphine

Corstorphine Cougars
- Full name: Corstophine Cougars Rugby Football Club
- Union: SRU
- Nickname: Cougars
- Founded: 1950; 76 years ago
- League(s): Women: Scottish Womens Premiership; Men: East Division 2
- 2024–25: Women: Scottish Womens Premiership, 1st of 8 (CH); Men: East Division 2, 4th of 8
Team kit

Official website
- www.cougarsrugby.co.uk

Corstorphine Cougars RFC is an Edinburgh rugby union club. Formed in 1950, the club represented the western Edinburgh suburb of Corstorphine. In 2017 the club was rebranded as Corstorphine Cougars. The Women's side play in Scottish Womens Premiership, the Men's side play in East Division 2.

== History ==
The club was officially formed as Corstorphine RFC in 1950. They played in different variations of navy and red strips. Most often in red and blue quarter panels.

=== Rugby Union in Union Park, Corstorphine ===
Edinburgh University first used Union Park in the 1870s for sport. Royal HSFP used the park for a short period before leaving Union Park to move to Jock's Lodge. The Corstorphine Amateur Association was formed in 1920 to use the sports grounds. The Association included athletics, cricket, hockey, football (soccer) and rugby for youths residing in the area. The rugby club was disbanded along with the rest of the Athletics association in 1939 with the outbreak of the war.

=== Formation of Corstorphine RFC ===
Corstorphine RFC was formed from the ashes of the Amateur Association rugby club, after the 2nd world war in 1950. Former pre-war Association rugby union players Alex Watson and Jock Waugh persuaded John McLean and David Fell to recruit sufficient local players to form a 1st and 2nd XV to play in the Edinburgh District League for junior clubs.

During the 1950s, 1960s and 1970s the club prospered winning the aforementioned league on several occasions. Full membership status to the Scottish Rugby Union was granted in 1973 with entry to the Division XI of the newly formed leagues. At its peak 1st, 2nd, 3rd and 4th XVs, along with a Codgers (over 35's) and a very large youth section, played rugby on the hallowed turf at Union Park.

The club achieved high points playing SRU Premiership 2 rugby and SRU Shield semi-final with a result coming down to the last play of the game before being beaten by Duns RFC. The club also made national news after defeating Premiership 1 side Kirkcaldy during a SRU cup run that was eventually ended in a hard-fought and close game against Premiership 2 side West of Scotland.

It also held the honour of holding the record for the longest-running fixture between Scottish and Irish clubs having played against Suttonians RFC from 1955 through to the late 1990s.

=== Merger ===
The club was merged with Royal HSFP in 2003. The new club was Royal High Corstorphine. The original idea of the new club was that it would be based jointly at Barnton - Royal High FP's ground - and at Union Park - Corstorphine RFC's ground.

=== Dissolve of the merger ===
As time went by 1st team matches were played at Barnton, with 2nd XV games at Union Park. With some of the then 1st team refusing to help support both grounds by playing a few games at Union Park it unearthed some fundamental differences in opinion on how a club should be run and funded. This caused friction between both Corstorphine and Royal High factions. The Royal High faction secretly moved to reform their own club in 2017, which forced RHC from the facilities at the school. This came at a cost as RHC were not in a position to compete in the National Leagues, opting instead to drop back to the East Region. League rules also meant 'Royal High' began as 'Barnton RFC' before the name was relinquished (Corstorphine retained the name Royal High Corstorphine for legal reasons until the 2018/19 season) Barnton also lost its league position in the National Leagues and was forced into the bottom regional league and became an associate member club. Corstorphine RFC remained as a full member club of the SRU.

== Corstorphine Cougars ==
RHC was re-branded as the Corstorphine Cougars in 2017. It runs two men's sides who play in the East Region leagues and two women's side who play in the Premiership and regional Leagues. The club has a well established minis section and in 2025 launched the Cougar Academy as a vehicle for its youth rugby programme.

== Honours ==
- Men's Arnold Clark East Region Division 2
  - Champions (1): 2025/26
- Women’s Scottish Premiership
  - Champions (1): 2024/25 Season
- Peebles Sevens
  - Champions (1): 1996
- Musselburgh Sevens
  - Champions: 1994

== Tours ==
Two very notable achievements in terms of tours at Corstorphine.

As mentioned earlier Suttonians RFC was long the destination for the club tour. The club holding the record for the longest running fixture between Scottish and Irish clubs having played against Suttonians RFC from 1955 through to the late 1990s. A link was re-established in 2020 as the women's team toured in Dublin.

In 1979 Corstorphine 3rd Team toured to the small Lake District town of Keswick RFC. This tour has continued to this day with the 40th tour celebrated in 2018. The two clubs play each year in April/May for the Corwick Trophy. This is possibly the longest running fixture between two Scottish and English Clubs. This is yet to be verified.
