= Irvine RFC =

Scottish rugby union club, based in Irvine

(Scotland) Irvine
- Full name: Irvine Rugby Football Club
- Union: Scottish Rugby Union
- Founded: 1962
- Location: Irvine, Scotland
- Ground: Marress
- League: West Division Two
- 2025–26: West Division Two, 8th of 9
Team kit	2nd kit

Official website
- www.irvinerugbyclub.co.uk

Irvine Rugby Football Club is a Rugby Football club in the Scottish Rugby Union, that plays its rugby in the West Division Two. They are based in Irvine, Scotland and play their Rugby at Marress.

== History ==
=== Beginning ===
Irvine Royal Academy was predominantly a football playing school until the late forties when a rugby playing gym teacher arrived at the school. Harry "Stasher" Murray set about introducing rugby football to the uninitiated of Irvine. For twelve or so years, those who wished to continue playing rugby after school, had to travel to Ardrossan Academicals to play at the club there. In the early sixties some senior pupils at the school suggested that it was time that Irvine should have a team of its own and a meeting was held. By late 1962 Irvine Royal Academicals had been constituted with Bill Inglis, a history teacher at the school, as its first president. A young Alastair McHarg was fixture secretary, with Gus McIntyre as secretary and Alister Rennie as treasurer.

From that December to March 1963 the committee chose the club colours of a maroon jersey, as Gala were the only team who were known to play in that colour at that time and also blue stockings to connect with the school colours. Interest in the town was so strong that fixtures were organised for two teams.

=== First season ===
1963–64 was the first competitive season for the Irvine squad and one unlikely ever to be repeated again. The first time the try line had been crossed by an opposing player was not until halfway through the season. Irvine had gone four months without conceding a try, an unbelievable feat nowadays. Irvine were only defeated once in their inaugural season and their club captain John McHarg, who was involved with the club as a coach for many decades after being a player, set the standard for his future successors.

=== Players and club name change 1969 ===
Players at the club in 1969 included Jimmy Williamson, Bill Nolan, Jimmy McDowell, Bill McCulloch, Alastair Kennedy, Ronnie Alexander, George Blackie, Alan Stirling, William Kerr, David Grier, John McHarg, John Paton, Harry Fox, Alasdair Camlin, Peter Coull, Bill Browning, Campbell Cunningham, Jim Gemmell, John Shearer, Joe Hobson and George McDowall.

The club were conscious of the population explosion in the area. With a number of new schools opening with the development of Irvine New Town the team colours remained the same, although the club would now be known as Irvine Rugby Football Club.

== Irvine Sevens ==
The club run the Irvine Sevens.

== New Town Sevens ==
This Sevens tournament was peripatetic around the new towns of Scotland:- East Kilbride, Glenrothes, Cumbernauld, Livingston and Irvine. The town's rugby clubs of East Kilbride RFC, Glenrothes RFC, Cumbernauld RFC, Livingston RFC and Irvine RFC would play in a Sevens tournament to become the New Town Sevens Champions and win the Scottish New Towns Cup.

== Honours ==
- National League Division 1 (fourth tier)
  - Champions: 2006-07
- National League Division 4 (seventh tier)
  - Champions: 2000-01
- National Bowl
  - Winners: 2023–24

=== Sevens ===
- New Towns Sevens
  - Champions: 1979
- Arran Sevens
  - Champions: 1988, 1990, 1993, 2019
- Helensburgh Sevens
  - Champions: 1988
- Cumnock Sevens
  - Champions: 1985
- Clydesdale Sevens
  - Champions: 1998
- Drumpellier Sevens
  - Champions: 1988, 1989
