= Kilmarnock RFC =

Scottish rugby union club, based in Kilmarnock

(Scotland) Kilmarnock RFC
- Full name: Kilmarnock Rugby Football Club
- Founded: 1868; 158 years ago
- Location: Kilmarnock, Scotland
- Ground: Bellsland
- President: John Brown
- Coach: Stuart Pratt
- League: Scottish National League Division Four
- 2024–25: West Division One, 1st of 10 (promoted)
Team kit

Official website
- www.pitchero.com/clubs/kilmarnock

Kilmarnock Rugby Football Club is a Scottish rugby union club which was founded in 1868, and is based in Kilmarnock, Ayrshire in west central Scotland. They play in Scottish National League Division Four. Often simply referred to as "Killie", their ground is at Bellsland in Kilmarnock, and they were formerly based at Rugby Park (hence its name).

One of the oldest rugby clubs in Scotland, Kilmarnock Football Club owes its existence to KRFC as an internal dispute about which football rules to adopt resulted in a breakaway in early 1869 by those who preferred to play association football.

== History ==
When the Scottish National Leagues were introduced in 1973, Killie were placed in the 3rd Division by the Scottish Rugby Union. The club won that season without loss. The following season saw Killie being runners up in Division 2, gaining promotion to the top league. They remained there until 1981 after which a period of promotion and relegation between the 1st and 2nd Divisions was the norm. In 1978, Killie achieved their highest league position by finishing 3rd in Division 1. In 1986, Killie were the only team to beat Hawick as they swept all aside to win the Championship.

Since the change in league structure to embrace professionalism, Killie have struggled to hold on to their better players and now languish in Division 1 of the West Regional League. It is also likely that Killie took part in the first floodlit rugby match at Rugby Park, now the home of Kilmarnock FC. There is also a school of thought that South African team Transvaal, now the Golden Lions Super Rugby team, adopted the famous Kilmarnock strip of white top with red hoop as a Kilmarnock member, Alex Frew, captained them when they beat The British Isles touring team in 1903. Frew was also a Scottish Internationalist while attending the University of Edinburgh.

Kilmarnock had a reputation in the 1960s and 1970s of producing top class seven-a-side teams who won many tournaments in west central Scotland. This form was sadly never taken into the Border's Sevens Circuit in the 1970s and 1980s when Killie were a regular feature in all the most prestigious events.

More recent Kilmarnock 1st XV won promotion to RBS NATIONAL 1 for the first time in 20 years after a tough season in 2010–11.

Kilmarnock 2nd XV also known as "the Penguins" have not lost a home game at Bellsland in five seasons. They won the league title 2011–12 having only lost one game away from home. This promotes them into National 2, the second highest level available for 2nd XV teams in Scotland.

Kilmarnock 3rd XV more commonly known as the Killie Polar Bears have won three consecutive league titles 2008–09, 2009–10 and 2010–11 while being managed by John Cairns and Ivor Frater. They have been promoted to the RBS RESERVE LEAGUE WEST POD B making them the only 3rd XV in the division.

== Kilmarnock Sevens ==
The club run the Kilmarnock Sevens competition. The tournament began in 1933.

== Notable players ==
Kilmarnock players to have been capped for Scotland whilst at the club include hooker Andrew Ross and Bill Cuthbertson. Andrew toured with the British Lions in 1924 to South Africa while Bill was part of the 1984 Grand Slam winning team. Bill also played for Barbarian F.C. while at Killie. Other players of note to have played for Killie include;

- John (Can) Cairns
- Alex Frew
- Niven Rose
- Hugh McHardy
- Ian Blake
- (Scotland) Derek Stark
- John Robertson
- Derek Martin
- Brian Gilbert
- Gavin Angus
- Hugh Hamilton
- Stewart Porter
- Scott Grant
- Hugh Parker
- Dougie Smith
- David Gray
- Iain Coull
- (Scotland) Bill Cuthbertson

David Gibson, John Stewart and his brother Andrew Stewart all played for Scottish Colleges and Universities. Andrew Stewart was also captain of the Scottish under 18 Team; Andrew, who is now resident in New Zealand, and a professor of Sports Science, has also been involved with the fitness regime of the All Blacks.

== Honours ==
- Kilmarnock Sevens
  - Champions: 1938, 1946, 1951, 1956, 1957, 1960, 1962, 1966, 1971, 1972, 1974, 1996
- Ardrossan Sevens
  - Champions: 1956, 1957, 1958, 1959, 1971, 1972, 1995, 1997
- Irvine Sevens
  - Champions: 1984, 1985
- Arran Sevens
  - Champions: 1984, 2022
- Hillhead HSFP Sevens
  - Champions: 1974, 1975, 1983
- Glasgow University Sevens
  - Champions: 1945, 1975, 1981, 1983, 1990, 1991
- Clarkston Sevens
  - Champions: 1971, 1972, 1974, 1975, 1978, 1980
- Cumnock Sevens
  - Champions: 1972, 1974, 1975
- Hillhead Jordanhill Sevens
  - Champions: 1990
- Wigtownshire Sevens
  - Champions: 1958, 1965, 1985
- Glasgow Academicals Sevens
  - Champions: 1972, 1977
- Allan Glen's Sevens
  - Champions: 1980, 1981, 1983
- Ayr Sevens
  - Champions: 1939, 1957, 1960, 1975, 1979, 1980, 1983, 1985, 1989
- Stirling Sevens
  - Champions: 1960, 1975
- Greenock Sevens
  - Champions: 1958, 1971, 1974, 1975,
- Dumfries Sevens
  - Champions (1): 2006
- Paisley Sevens
  - Champions (1): 2012

== Bibliography ==
- Massie, Allan A Portrait of Scottish Rugby (Polygon, Edinburgh; ISBN 0-904919-84-6)
