= Cumnock RFC =

Scottish rugby union club

Cumnock
- Full name: Cumnock Rugby Football Club
- Union: Scottish Rugby Union
- Founded: 1962
- Location: Cumnock, Scotland
- Ground(s): Broomfield, Auchinleck Rd
- League(s): West Division Two
- 2019–20: West Division One, 3rd of 10
Team kit

Official website
- www.pitchero.com/clubs/cumnock

Cumnock RFC is a rugby union club based in East Ayrshire. The club has teams from Primary 1's right up to the adult 1st XV who play in West Division Two.

== Cumnock Sevens ==
The club host the Cumnock Sevens tournament. The entrants play for the David Ansell Memorial Trophy.

== Honours ==
BT West Regional Bowl winners, Finalist of BT National Bowl. BT West Div 3 Champions 14/15.

- Arran Sevens
  - Champions: 1985, 1986
- Glasgow Warriors Community Club of the Season
  - Champions: 2015-16

== Notable former players ==
=== Scotland internationalists ===
The following former Cumnock players have represented Scotland at full international level.

- (Scotland) Mark Bennett
- (Scotland) Ian Jardine

=== Glasgow District ===
The following former Cumnock players have represented Glasgow District at provincial level.

- (Scotland) Ian Jardine

=== Glasgow Warriors ===
The following former Cumnock players have represented Glasgow Warriors at provincial level.

- (Scotland) Mark Bennett
- (Scotland) Gavin Lowe
- (Scotland) Ian Jardine
