= Lenzie RFC =

Scottish rugby union team

- Full name: Lenzie Rugby Football Club
- Union: Scottish Rugby Union
- Founded: 1898; 127 years ago
- Location: Lenzie, Scotland
- Ground(s): Viewfield
- League(s): West Division One
- 2019–20: West Division Two, 5th of 10

Lenzie RFC is a rugby union side based in Lenzie, East Dunbartonshire, Scotland. The club was founded in 1898. They play their home games at Viewfield.

== History ==
The opening match of Lenzie RFC was reputed to be against the crew of HMS Benbow in 1898.

The club won the SRU's Scotland's team of the month competition in March 2019.

They won the Tennents West Division 2 in season 2018–19.

As well as a 1st and 2nd Men's XV, the club also run Junior sides for boys and girls and a Women's XV.

== Notable former players ==
=== Glasgow Warriors ===
The following former Lenzie players went on to represent Glasgow Warriors.

- (Scotland) Andrew Garry

== Lenzie Sevens ==
Lenzie play host to the Lenzie Sevens tournament. The tournament has run since 1969.

== Honours ==
- Lenzie Sevens
  - Champions: 1970, 1977, 1980, 1981, 1982, 1983, 1990, 1995
- St. Mungos Sevens
  - Champions: 1980, 1983
- Dumfries Sevens
  - Champions: 1981
- Lanarkshire Sevens
  - Champions: 1977, 1979
- Helensburgh Sevens
  - Champions: 1977, 1979, 1981
- Hillfoots Sevens
  - Champions: 1989
- Stirling Sevens
  - Champions: 1954, 1959
- West Division 2
  - Champions: 2019
- Glasgow Warriors Community Club of the Season
  - Champions: 2018-19
