= Scottish Women's Premiership (rugby union) =

Scottish rugby union competition

- Formerly: SWRU Premier League
- Sport: Rugby union
- Founded: 1993
- No. of teams: 8
- Country: Scotland
- Most recent champion: Corstorphine (1st title)
- Broadcasters: BBC Alba; Scottish Rugby Youtube
- Sponsor: Arnold Clark
- Level on pyramid: 1
- Relegation to: Caledonia Midlands/East, North, or West (via regional play-off series)
- Domestic cup: Sarah Beaney Cup
- Website: https://www.scottishrugby.org/

The Scottish Women's Premiership (known as the Arnold Clark Women's Premiership for sponsorship reasons) is the highest level of league competition for women's amateur rugby union clubs in Scotland.

== History ==
The Women’s League was restructured in 2018. A consultation process with clubs began in 2017 where clubs were invited to apply for the league that they felt best suited their women’s teams.

== Teams ==
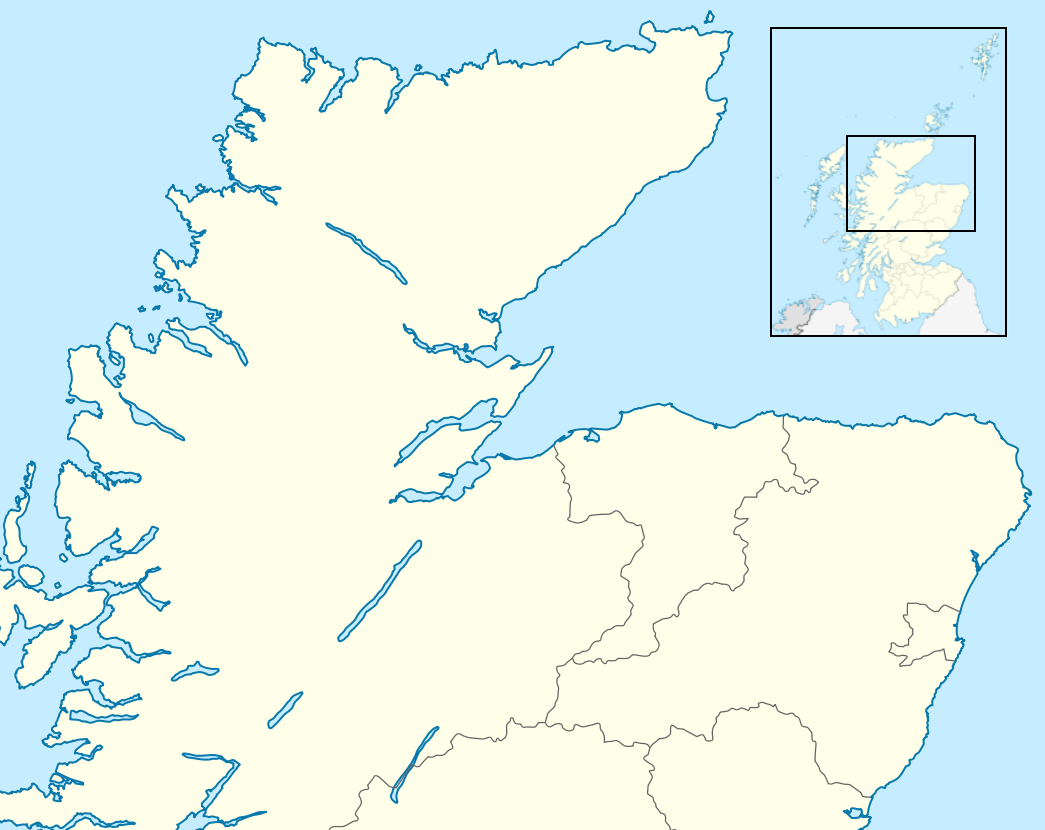
Location of 2025–26 Scottish Women's Premiership teams in the north of Scotland
Location of 2025–26 Scottish Women's Premiership teams in the south of Scotland
- Biggar
- Corstorphine
- Cartha Queens Park
- Garioch
- Heriot's
- Hillhead Jordanhill
- Stirling County
- Watsonians

== Past winners ==
2008. Murrayfield Wanderers
2009. Murrayfield Wanderers
2010. Murrayfield Wanderers
2011. Hillhead Jordanhill
2012. Murrayfield Wanderers
2013. Hillhead Jordanhill
2014. Hillhead Jordanhill
2015. Murrayfield Wanderers
2016. Murrayfield Wanderers
2017. Murrayfield Wanderers
2018. Hillhead Jordanhill
2019. Watsonians
2020. Watsonians
2021. No competition
2022. Watsonians
2023. Stirling County
2024. Stirling County
2025. Corstorphine
