= Cumbernauld RFC =

Scottish rugby union team

(Scotland) Cumbernauld RFC
- Union: Scottish Rugby Union
- Location: Cumbernauld, Scotland
- League(s): West Division Three
- 2019–20: West Division Three, 4th in Conf 1
Team kit

Cumbernauld RFC is a Scottish Rugby Union team based in Cumbernauld, North Lanarkshire, Scotland. Home ground is at Auchenkilns Holdings on the south side of Condorrat. The 1st XV play in West Division Three.

Cumbernauld RFC's nickname is the Badgers.

The Badgers largest ever win was against Paisley, 156 - 0. This win was during the time of the Badgers most successful team ever and arguably the best team to have played at Auchenkilns.

== New Town Sevens ==
This Sevens tournament was peripatetic around the new towns of Scotland:- East Kilbride, Glenrothes, Cumbernauld, Livingston and Irvine. The town's rugby clubs of East Kilbride RFC, Glenrothes RFC, Cumbernauld RFC, Livingston RFC and Irvine RFC would play in a Sevens tournament to become the New Town Sevens Champions and the Scottish New Towns Cup.
