= Royal High Corstorphine RFC =

- Full name: Royal High Corstorphine Rugby Football Club
- Emblem: Cougar head
- Founded: 2003
- Disbanded: 2017
- Ground(s): Union Park & Barnton

Royal High Corstorphine RFC is a former Edinburgh rugby union club, formed from the merger of the Royal HSFP and Corstorphine RFC. The merged club was dissolved in 2017 as two clubs:- Corstorphine Cougars and Royal HSFP.

== History ==
Royal High Corstorphine was formed in 2003 from the merger of two Edinburgh rugby union sides:- Royal HSFP and Corstorphine RFC. RHC was originally planned as a bilateral club based both in Royal HSFP's Barnton ground and Corstorphine RFC's Union Park.

The women's side produced several Scotland international players.

== Dissolve of club ==
As time passed more and more matches were being played in Barnton; eventually the 1st XV playing in Barnton and the 2nd XV played in Union Park. This highlighted differences between the two factions on how a club should be run and the merged club was dissolved into two clubs.

== Honours ==
=== Men ===
- Edinburgh Northern Sevens
  - Champions : (1) 2004

== Notable players ==
=== Men's ===
- Andrew Crammond - played for Edinburgh at under-16, under-17 and under-18 levels, and for Scotland under-18. He made his Scotland under-20 debut in Athlone in January 2014, against Ireland in the 6 Nations and scored his first try, against France, at Netherdale on 7 March 2014. Represented Scotland at the U20 World Championships in New Zealand in 2013. He currently plays for Toulon.

=== Scotland Women Internationals ===
- Lee Cockburn
- Sonia Cull
- Louise Dalgliesh
- Cara DiSilva
- Sarah Dixon
- Ronnie Fitzpatrick
- Tanya Griffith
- Donna Kennedy
- Alison MacDonald
- Jilly McCord
- Mags McHardy
- Louise Moffat
- Lynne Reid
- Gayle Stewart
- Mhairi Grieve
- Karen Dunbar
- Katie Dougan

== The Brothers ==
From 2010 the 2nd XV have been branded as The Brothers named Marc Maiden. Under the new team name The Brothers started the 2010–11 season winning 9 out of 9 games

The 2nd XV continued as a successful outfit with the management team of Mike "Iron" Whitside and Dougie Cross.
