= Women's rugby union in Scotland =

The Women's domestic rugby union leagues in Scotland are organised in a similar vein to the men's domestic leagues: on a national basis for the top leagues and regional leagues below feeding into those leagues.

The top two Women's national leagues are the Arnold Clark Premiership and the Arnold Clark National League. The following leagues are split by region.

== History ==
Women's rugby union in Scotland was amalgamated with the main governing body, Scottish Rugby Union in 2009 after a unanimous vote at their AGM

=== Sponsorship ===
The league is currently sponsored by Arnold Clark. It was previously sponsored by the drinks firm Tennents. Prior to Tennents sponsorship, the telecommunications firm British Telecom were sponsors.

== Current season ==
These are the teams competing for the championship in each league for the 2026–27 season.

=== Arnold Clark Premiership - Stage 1 (Women's) ===
- Biggar RFC
- Cartha Queens Park RFC
- Corstorphine RFC
- Garioch RFC
- Heriot's Rugby Women
- Hillhead Jordanhill RFC
- Stirling County RFC
- Watsonian FC

=== Arnold Clark National League (Women's) ===
- Ayr RFC
- Dundee Valkyries
- Highland RFC
- Greenock Wanderers RFC
- West of Scotland FC
- Wigtownshire RFC

=== Arnold Clark Caledonia Midlands/East Region League Division 1 (Women's) ===
- Broughton RFC
- Dundee Valkyries 2nd XV
- Grangemouth Stags RFC
- Hillfoots Vixens
- Howe of Fife RFC
- Lismore RFC

=== Arnold Clark Caledonia Midlands/East Region League Division 2 (Women's) ===
- Dalkeith RFC
- Falkirk RFC
- Gala RFC
- Kirkcaldy RFC
- Leith Rugby Club
- Livingston RFC
- Musselburgh RFC
- Perthshire RFC

=== Arnold Clark Caledonia North Region League Division 1 (Women's) ===
- Aberdeenshire Quines
- Caithness Krakens
- Lochaber RFC
- Shetland Valkyries

=== Arnold Clark Caledonia North Region League Division 2 (Women's) ===
- Aberdeen University Women
- Inverness Craig Dunain Women
- Garioch 2nd XV
- Orkney Dragons

=== Arnold Clark Caledonia West Region League Division 1 (Women's) ===
- Annan RFC
- Bishopton RFC
- Hillhead Jordanhill 2XV
- Lenzie RFC
- Oban Lorne RFC
- Stewartry RFC

=== Arnold Clark Caledonia West Region League Division 2 (Women's) ===
- Cartha Queens Park RFC (2nd XV)
- Irvine RFC
- Marr RFC
- Strathaven RFC
- Uddingston RFC

=== Arnold Clark Caledonia West Region League Division 3 (Women's) ===
- Carrick RFC
- East Kilbride RFC
- Mid Argyll RFC
- Paisley RFC
- Whitecraigs Rugby Club

=== Women's West Region Development League ===
- Dalziel Women RFC
- Helensburgh Bear Maidens
- Kilmarnock RFC
- Lenzie RFC (2nd XV)

== Previous seasons ==
There was a restructuring of the women's leagues in 2018.

=== National Competitions - Season 2016/17 ===
==== 2016–17 BT Women's Premier League ====
Premier League consists of eight teams as listed on the Scottish Rugby Union website (in alphabetical order):

- Ayr Women (part of Ayr RFC)
- Cartha Queens Park Women (part of Cartha Queens Park RFC)
- Hillhead/Jordanhill Women (part of Hillhead Jordanhill RFC)
- Melrose Women (part of Melrose RFC)
- Murrayfield Wanderers FC Women (part of Murrayfield Wanderers RFC)
- RHC Cougars Women (part of Royal High Corstorphine RFC)
- Stewartry Women
- Stirling County Women (part of Stirling County RFC)

==== BT Women's National League Division 1 16-17 ====
National 1 consists of seven teams (in alphabetical order):

- Aberdeenshire Quines (part of Aberdeenshire RFC)
- Broughton Women
- Garioch Women
- Glasgow University Women
- Greenock Women
- Kirkcaldy Women
- Watsonians Ladies

==== BT Women's National League Division 2 16-17 ====
National 2 consists of seven teams (in alphabetical order):

- Annan Women
- Grangemouth Stagettes
- Greenock Wanderers Women
- Howe of Fife Women
- Lismore Women
- Oban Lorne Women
- Royal Dick Vet College Women

==== BT Women's North 16-17 ====
National 2 consists of four teams (in alphabetical order):

- Banff
- Inverness
- Orkney
- Shetland

==== National Development League ====
- Helensburgh
- Kelso
- Livingston
- Liberton

=== National Competitions - Season 2015/16 ===
==== 2015–16 BT Women's Premier League ====
Premier League consisted of 6 teams as listed on the Scottish Rugby Union website (in alphabetical order):

- Cartha Queens Park Women (part of Cartha Queens Park RFC)
- Hillhead/Jordanhill Women (part of Hillhead Jordanhill RFC)
- Melrose Women (part of Melrose RFC)
- Murrayfield Wanderers FC Women (part of Murrayfield Wanderers RFC)
- RHC Cougars Women (part of Royal High Corstorphine RFC
- Stirling County Women (part of Stirling County RFC)

==== BT Women's National League Division 1 15-16 ====
National 1 consisted of eight teams (in alphabetical order):

- Aberdeenshire Quines (part of Aberdeenshire RFC)
- Ayr Women(part of Ayr RFC)
- Broughton Women
- Glasgow University Women
- Kirkcaldy Women
- Oban Lorne Women
- Stewartry Women
- Watsonians Ladies

==== BT Women's National League Division 2 15-16 ====
National 2 consisted of eight teams (in alphabetical order):

- Annan Women
- Garioch Women
- Grangemouth
- Greenock Wanderers Women
- Howe of Fife Women
- Lismore Women
- Morgan Women
- Royal Dick Vet College Women

==== National Development League ====
- Banff
- Helensburgh
- Inverness
- Kelso
- Strathclyde Uni
