= List of Scotland rugby union players killed in World War I =

The following is a list of Scottish Rugby Union footballers killed in World War I.

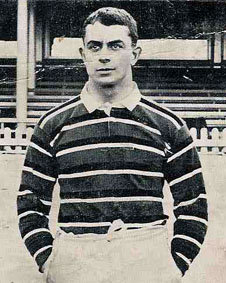
David Bedell-Sivright

- Cecil Halliday Abercrombie, died on 31 May 1916 aged 30
- David McLaren Bain, died on 3 June 1915, aged 24
- David Bedell-Sivright ("Darkie Bedell-Sivright"), died on 5 September 1915, aged 35
- Patrick Charles Bentley Blair, died on 6 July 1915 aged 24.
- John Argentine Campbell, died on 1 December 1917, aged 40.
- William Campbell Church, died on 28 June 1915, aged 32.
- Walter Michael Dickson, died on 26 September 1915, aged 30.
- John Henry Dods, died on 31 December 1915, aged 40
- Walter Torrie Forrest, died on 19 April 1917, aged 36
- Rowland Fraser, died on 1 July 1916, aged 26.
- William Elphinstone Gordon, died on 30 August 1918, aged 25
- James Young Milne Henderson, died on 31 July 1917, aged 26
- David Dickie Howie ("Dave Howie"), died on 19 January 1916, aged 27
- James Laidlaw Huggan, died on 16 September 1914, aged 25
- William Ramsay Hutchison, died on 22 March 1918, aged 29
- George A.W. Lamond, died on 25 February 1918, aged 39
- Eric Milroy, ("Puss Milroy") died on 18 July 1916 aged 28.
- Thomas Arthur Nelson, died on 9 April 1917, aged 40
- James Pearson, died on 22 May 1915, aged 26
- Lewis Robertson, died on 3 November 1914, aged 31
- James Ross, died on 31 October 1914, aged 34
- Andrew Ross, died on 6 April 1916, aged 36
- Ronald Francis Simson, died on 14 September 1914, aged 24
- Stephen Sebastian Leonard Steyn, died on 8 December 1917, aged 28
- Walter Riddell Sutherland ("Wattie Suddie"), died on 4 October 1918, aged 27
- Frederick Harding Turner, died on 10 January 1915, aged 26
- Albert Luvian Wade, died on 28 April 1917, aged 32.
- William Middleton Wallace, died on 22 August 1915, aged 22
- John George Will, died on 25 March 1917, aged 24
- John Skinner Wilson, died on 31 May 1916, aged 32
- Eric Templeton Young, died on 28 June 1915, aged 23

== See also ==
- List of international rugby union players killed in action during the First World War
- List of Wales rugby union footballers killed in the World Wars
- List of Scottish rugby union players killed in World War II
