= List of international rugby union players killed in World War I =

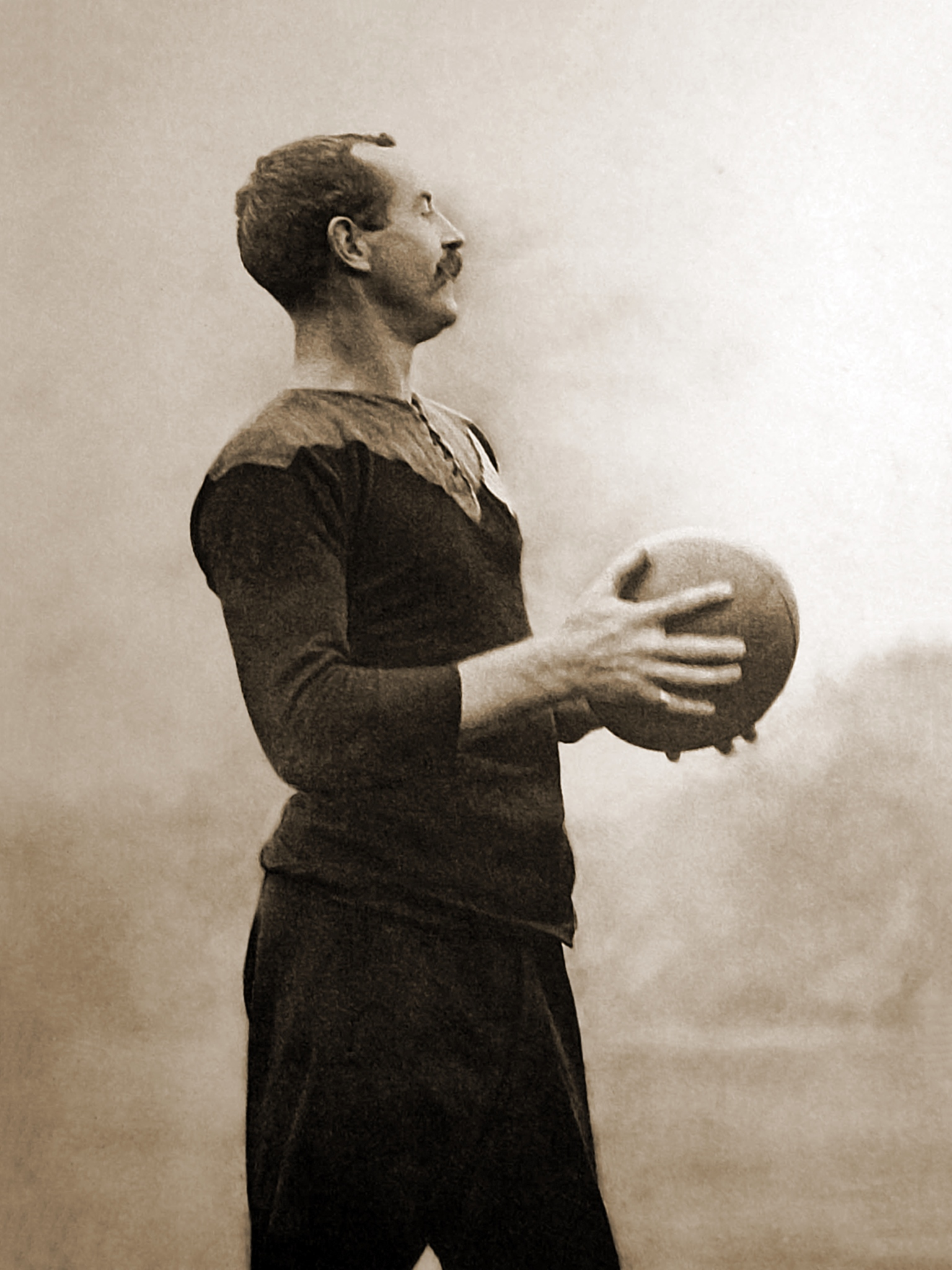
Dave Gallaher (New Zealand), considered one of the greatest players of rugby at the turn of the 20th century

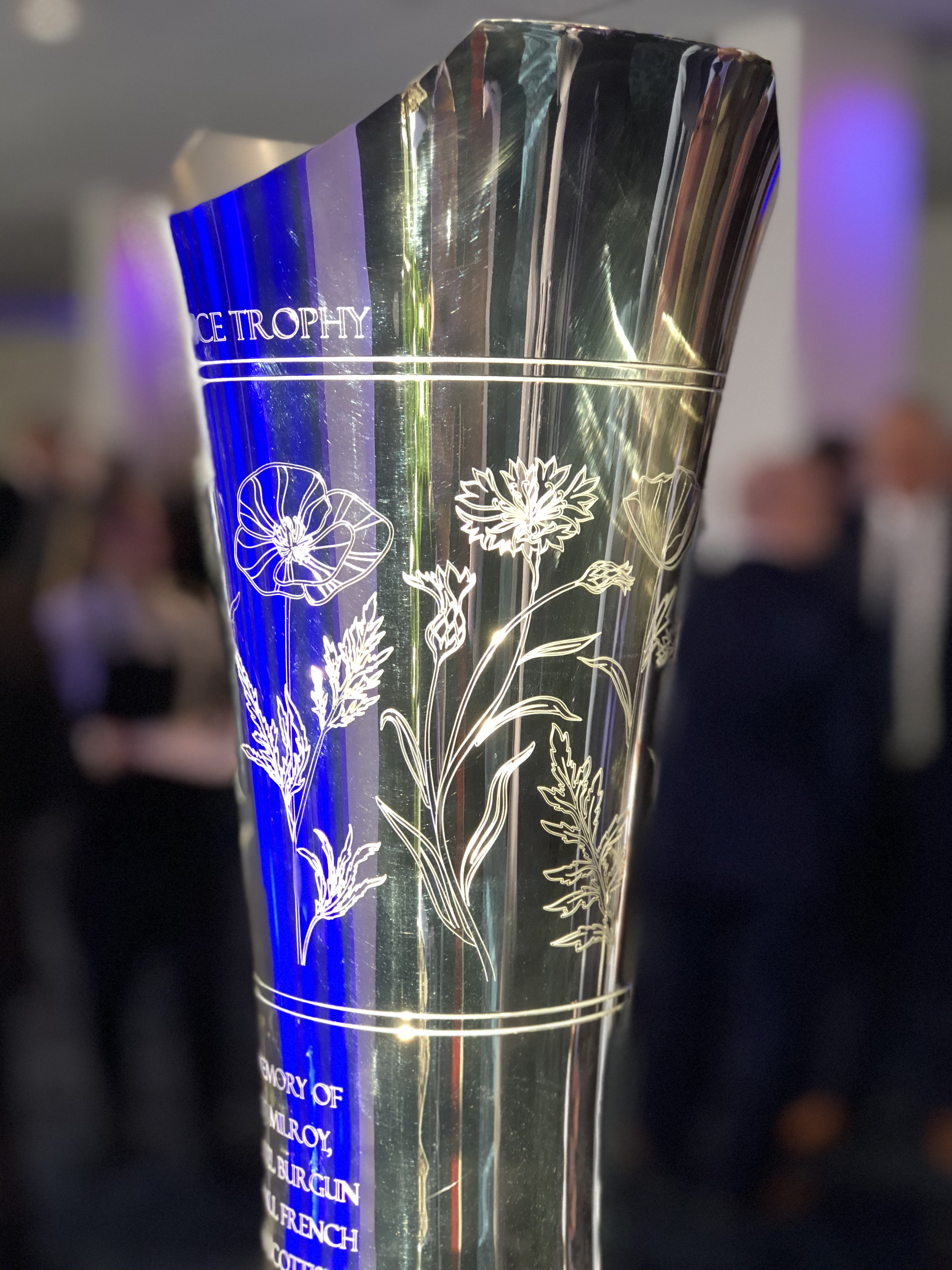
The Auld Alliance Trophy is contested annually by Scotland and France, and commemorates the Scottish and French rugby internationals who died in the First World War.

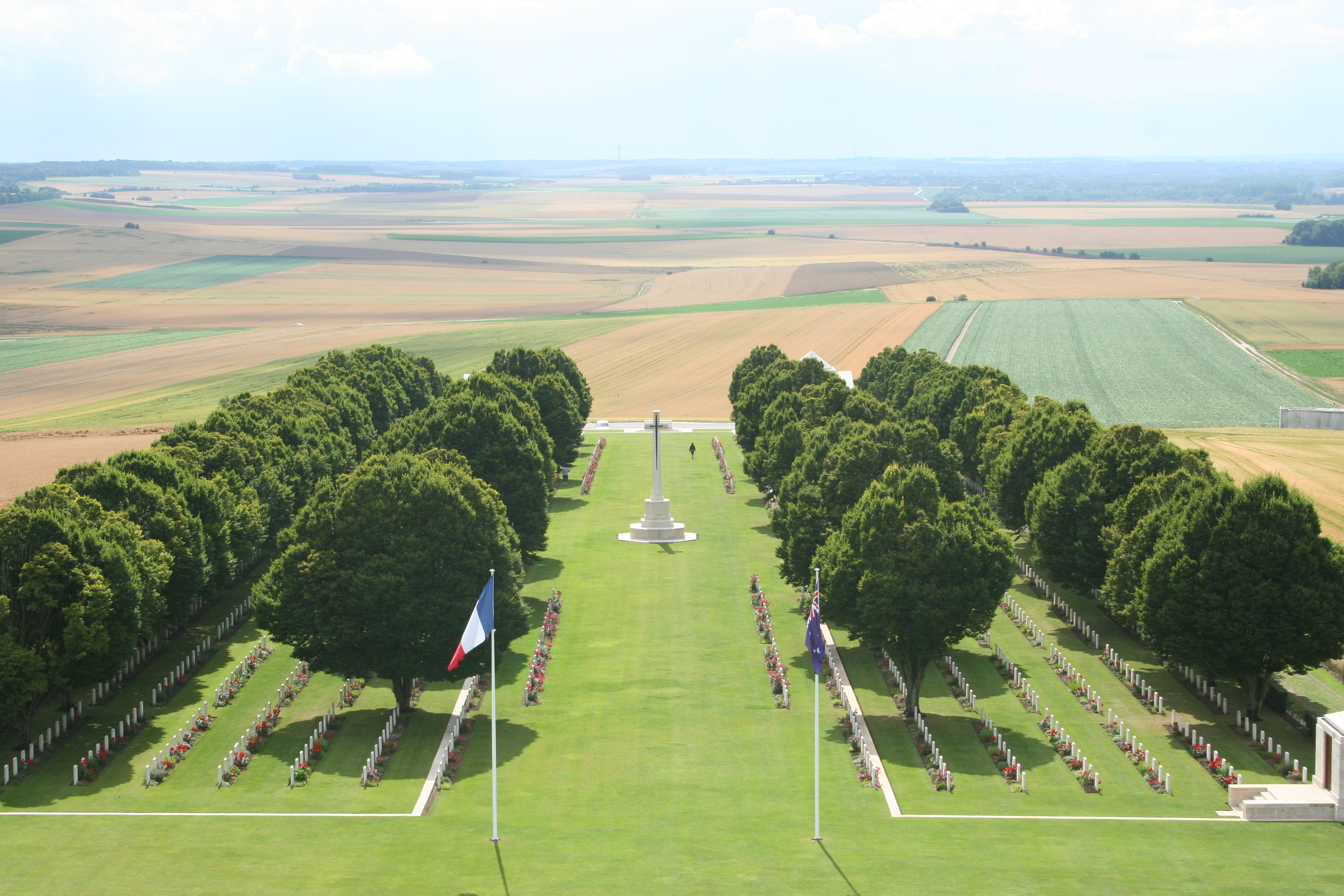
Memorial in Villers-Bretonneux where lies William Tasker and 770 other Australian fallen

This is a list of international rugby union players who died serving in armed forces during the First World War. Most of these came from the British Commonwealth, but a number of French international rugby players were also killed. A number of major teams, whose nations were belligerents in World War I such as Japan, Canada, Italy, Fiji, Tonga and Samoa had not made their international debuts at this point in time, and the United States team had only been in existence for around two years prior to the war. Also, none of the Central Powers had true national rugby squads at this point although there had been rugby clubs in Germany since the late 19th century, and the German Rugby Federation is the oldest national rugby union in continental Europe. However, Germany did put forward a team for rugby union at the 1900 Summer Olympics (although not the 1908 tournament, which involved only two sides) – Olympic rugby was not seen as particularly prestigious – and it is not known if any of that team were war casualties.

The war took an extremely heavy toll upon rugby at all levels, and this list includes some major figures, such as Dave Gallaher, who led a major All Blacks tour to the British Isles in 1905; David Bedell-Sivright, who is sometimes considered one of the greatest Scottish players of all time; and Ronnie Poulton-Palmer who is similarly honoured by the English; and the Frenchman Jean Bouin, better known as a middle-distance runner at the 1908 Olympics as well as the 1912 Games.

The first rugby international to die in World War I was France and Stade Toulousain scrum-half Alfred Mayssonnié on 6 September 1914.

== List by country ==
=== Australia ===
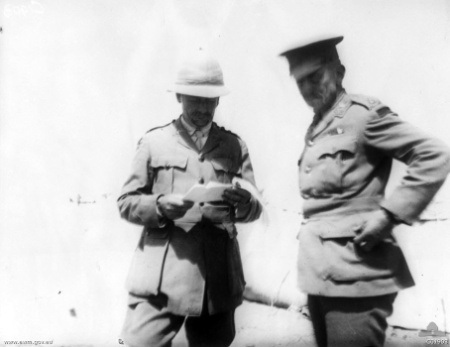
Blair Swannell (on right) in Egypt, 1915

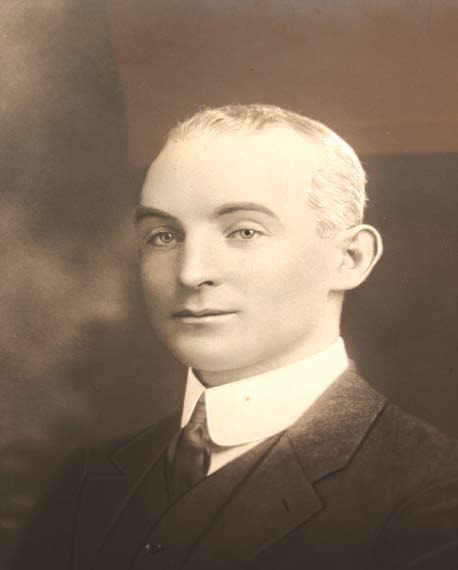
Edward Larkin, killed in Gallipoli

Although many rugby players were killed during the war, a large number were also injured or crippled, leading to their departure from the game. For example, the Australia and British Isles player Tom Richards had his back and shoulders damaged by a bomb blast and suffered respiratory problems the rest of his life, from gas attacks he had experienced on the Western Front, leading to his death from TB in 1935.

- Harold Wesley George, died on 10 May 1915, Aged 28.
- Bryan Desmond Hughes MC, died on 6 August 1918, Aged 32
- Hubert A Jones, died on 9 July 1918, Aged 28.
- Edward Larkin, died on 25 April 1915, Aged 34
- George Pugh, died on 5 September 1916, Aged 26
- Blair Swannell, killed in action on 25 April 1915, Aged 39
- William Tasker, died on 9 August 1918, Aged 26.
- Fred Thompson, killed in action on 29 May 1915, Aged 25.
- Jack Verge, died on 8 September 1915, Aged 35.
- Clarrie Wallach MC, died on 22 April 1918, Aged 28.

=== England ===
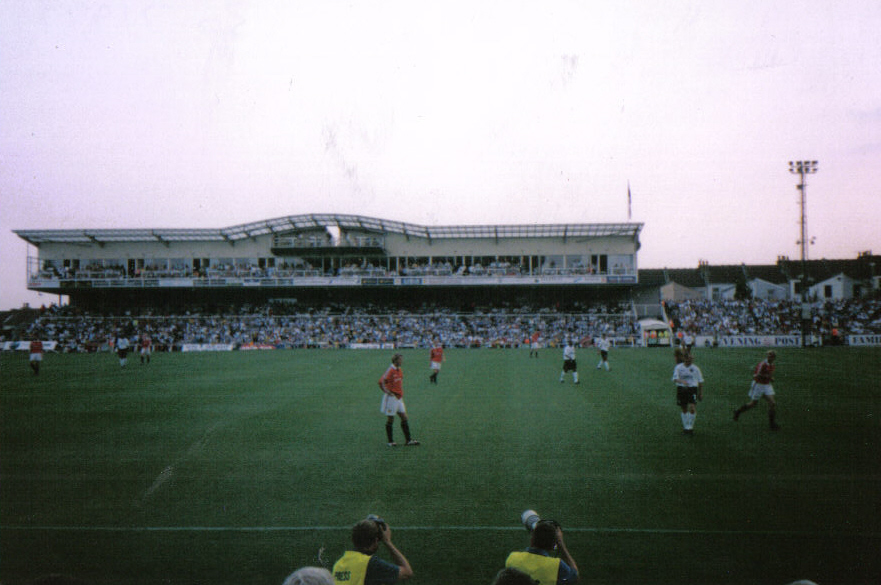
The Memorial Stadium in Bristol shown here during an association football game. It is named in honour of those rugby players who died in World War I

One of the most poignant stories is of Ronnie Poulton-Palmer, who had played against the South African tourists of 1912–13 only a few years before:

"Those who watched [Ronnie Poulton] play were certain that he was the greatest three-quarter ever to play the game and they held to that opinion all their lives..."

"Poulton later inherited a fortune on condition that he changed his name to Poulton-Palmer; he did not live to enjoy it, being killed by a sniper's bullet in the Great War. His last words before he died were: 'I shall never play at Twickenham again.'"

England had over twenty six players killed in the conflict. This was the second highest number of casualties, after Scotland. However, many of the Scotland players were "Anglos", i.e. based, born or playing in the England's domestic leagues for teams such as London Scottish FC or universities, so their loss affected English rugby too.

Henry Brougham is sometimes listed, because he died of war wounds. However, since he died in 1923, after the war had ended, he is also often omitted.

- Harry Alexander; died on 17 October 1915, aged 35
- Henry Berry; died on 9 May 1915, aged 32.
- Arthur James Dingle; died on 22 August 1915, aged 23
- George Eric Burroughs Dobbs, died on 17 June 1917, aged 32.
- Leonard Haigh, died on 6 August 1916, aged 29.
- Reginald Harry Myburgh "Reggie" Hands, died on 20 April 1918, aged 29 Hands was a South African who played cricket for South Africa and rugby for England.
- Arthur Leyland Harrison VC; died on 23 April 1918, aged 32
- Harold Augustus Hodges; died on 24 March 1918, aged 32
- Rupert Edward Inglis; died on 18 September 1916, aged 53
- Percy Dale Kendall; died on 21 January 1915, aged 34
- John Abbott King; died on 9 August 1916, aged 32
- Ronald Owen Lagden; died on 3 March 1915, aged 26
- Douglas Lambert; died on 13 October 1915, aged 32
- Alfred Frederick Maynard; died on 13 November 1916, aged 22
- Edgar Roberts Mobbs, ("Mobbsy") died on 29 July 1917, aged 37
- William Moore Bell Nanson; died on 4 June 1915, aged 34
- Francis Eckley Oakeley; died on 25 November 1914, aged 23
- Robert Pillman; died on 9 July 1916, aged 23
- Ronald William Poulton-Palmer, ("Ronnie Poulton") died on 5 May 1915, aged 25
- John Edward Raphael, died on 11 June 1917, aged 35
- Reginald Oscar "Reggie" Schwarz MC, died on 18 November 1918, aged 43
- Lancelot Andrew Noel Slocock; died on 9 August 1918, aged 29
- Francis Nathaniel Tarr; died on 18 July 1915, aged 27
- Alexander Findlater Todd, died on 21 April 1915, aged 41
- James Henry Digby Watson; died on 15 October 1914, aged 24
- Charles Edward Wilson; died 17 September 1914, aged 43
- Arthur James Wilson, died on 1 July 1917, aged 29

=== France ===
France is different from all the other nations mentioned on this list for two reasons – firstly, it was not part of the British Commonwealth nor English speaking, and secondly, unlike the other nations, it actually had a military front in its border territory.

Maurice Boyau particularly distinguished himself as a balloon buster and military flying ace, with 35 victories under his belt. He spent much of his flying career with Escadrille 77, known as "Les Sportifs" for the great number of athletes in its ranks. He had been captain of the French team before the war.

Stade Bordelais of Bordeaux was badly affected, losing players such as Boyau and Giacardy.

- Marie Jean-Baptiste Joseph Anduran ("Joé Anduran"); died on 2 October 1914, Aged 32
- René Emile Henri Boudreaux; died on 8 September 1915, Aged 34.
- Maurice Jean-Paul Boyau (Médaille militaire, Legion of Honour); died on 16 September 1918, Aged 30
- Marcel Henry Burgun; died on 2 September 1916, Aged 26.
- Jean-Jacques Conilh de Beyssac; died on 13 June 1918, Aged 28.
- Paul Decamps; died on 27 June 1915, Aged 31.
- Julien Dufau; died in December 1916, Aged 28.
- Paul Dupré; died on 15 May 1915, Aged 27.
- Albert Eutrope; died on 26 May 1915, Aged 27.
- Marc Giacardy; died on 20 August 1917, Aged 26
- Pierre Guillemin; died on 9 October 1915, Aged 27
- Maurice Hedembaigt; died on 5 August 1918, Aged 37.
- Emmanuel Iguinitz; died on 20 September 1914, Aged 24
- Daniel Ihingoué; died on 16 April 1917, Aged 28
- Henri Isaac; died on 20 June 1917 Aged 34
- Henri André Lacassagne; died on 11 November 1916, Aged 30
- Gaston Lane; died on 23 September 1914, Aged 31
- Jean Larribau; died on 31 December 1916, Aged 27
- Marcel Legrain; died on 27 June 1915, Aged 21.
- Alfred Mayssonnié ("Maysso"); died on 6 September 1914, aged 30
- François Poeydebasque; died on 21 December 1914, Aged 23
- Albert Chateau; died from wounds on 15 July 1924, aged 31

=== German Empire ===
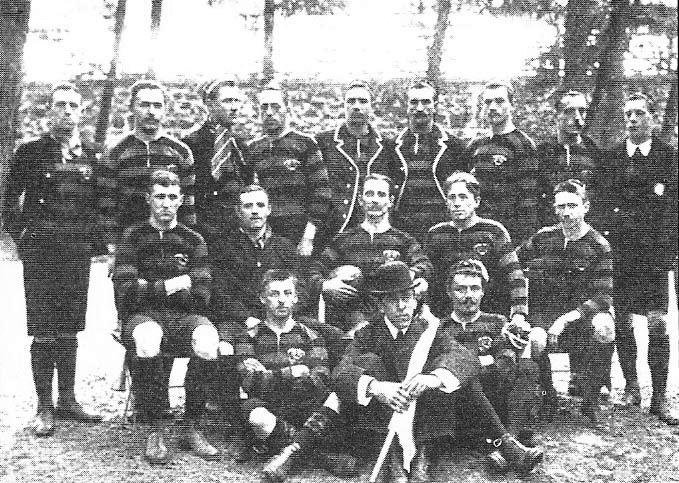
The German team at the 1900 Olympic Games

A German team competed at the 1900 Olympic tournament, represented by players from the SC 1880 Frankfurt club. It is not known if any of those 15 players died in World War I.

=== British Isles ===
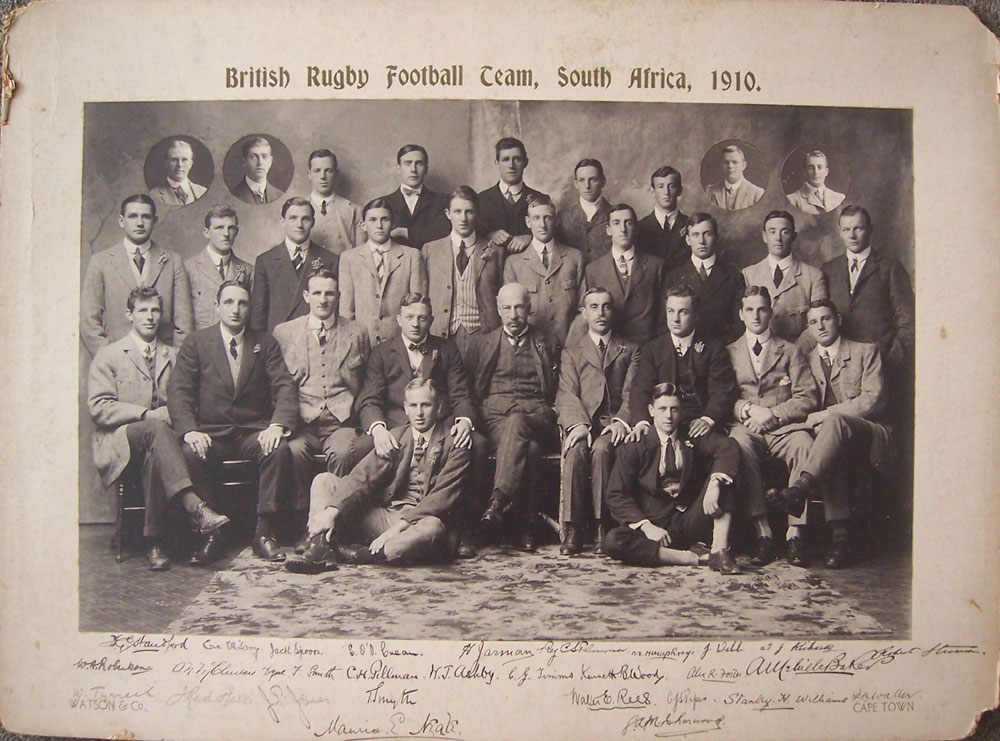
1910 British Isles team in South Africa, including Eric Milroy, Noel Humphreys and Phil Waller

==== British Isles team ====
Pre-World War I, it was not uncommon for members of the British Isles team (later known as the British & Irish Lions) to be uncapped for their nation of origin.

- Charlie Adamson (English), died on 17 September 1918, Aged 43.
- Sidney Nelson Crowther (English), died on 18 October 1914, Aged 39
- Noel Forbes Humphreys MC (Welsh), died 27 March 1918, Aged 27
- Ron Rogers (English), capped for British Isles in 1904, died Gallipoli 1915, aged 32.

Most British Isles players had been capped for their country, and can be found listed more fully under their respective countries. Capped players include the following.

- Australia: Blair Swannell
- England: John Raphael, Alexander Todd
- Ireland: Robertson Smyth
- Scotland: David Bedell-Sivright, Eric Milroy
- Wales: Phil Waller

==== Olympians ====
At least one competitor for the Great Britain Olympic team which competed at rugby union at the 1908 Summer Olympics, and gained silver died –

- Arthur Wilson, died 1 July 1917 (see also England)

Scotland and Ireland did not enters teams up for either the 1900 or 1908 Olympic rugby events; most of the "Great Britain" team were from England, particularly Cornwall.

=== Ireland ===
Ireland, unlike Great Britain and much of the British Empire did not have conscription during the war, although there was a disastrous attempt in 1918 to impose it. See also Ireland and World War I.

Portrait	Player	Playing years	Caps	Date of death (Age)	Place of death	Military service	Ref(s)
	Jasper Brett	1914	1	4 February 1917 (21)	Dalkey, Ireland	Served as second lieutenant in the 7th Battalion of the Royal Dublin Fusiliers at the Battle of Gallipoli and the Somme. Suffered from shell shock and committed suicide.	
	Robert Burgess	1912	1	9 December 1915 (25)	Armentières, France	Burgess was commissioned into the Royal Army Service Corps and served with the Royal Engineers. He was killed when he was hit by a shell while cycling down the rue de Dunkerque in Armentières.	
	Ernest Deane MC	1909	1	25 September 1915 (28)	Loos-en-Gohelle, France	After graduating from the Royal College of Surgeons in Ireland, Deane joined the Royal Army Medical Corps in 1911, and was stationed in India. In WWI he served as medical officer in the Leicestershire Regiment on the Western Front. Having already been awarded the Military Cross for bravery, at the Battle of Loos, Deane went to rescue men who had been caught up in German barbed wire, and was killed instantly by a shot to the head.	
	Billy Edwards	1912	2	29 December 1917 (30)	near Deir Ibzi, Palestine	Fought with Royal Irish Fusiliers at Ginchy. Transferred to Royal Dublin Fusiliers and served in Sinai and Palestine Campaign: Third Battle of Gaza, Battle of Jerusalem. Died near Deir Ibzi. Reburied at Jerusalem British war cemetery in 1918.	
	Basil Maclear	1905–1907	11	24 May 1915 (34)	Western Front (WWI)	Captain with the Royal Dublin Fusiliers; killed during the Second Battle of Ypres	
	Vincent McNamara	1914	3	29 November 1915 (24)	Suvla Bay, Gallipoli	McNamara served in the Royal Engineers, and died from gas in the trenches in Suvla Bay, Gallipoli.	
	Robertson Smyth	1903–1904	3+3	5 April 1916 (36)	London	Smyth joined the Royal Army Medical Corps in 1904, and served in India until the outbreak of WWI. He served on the Western Front until he was invalided through exposure to gas, and died a few months later.	
	Albert Stewart DSO	1913–14	2	4 October 1917 (28)	near Ypres, Belgium	Member of the Royal Irish Rifles, then transferred to the Machine Gun Corps. Fought in the Battle of the Somme. Died at the Battle of Broodseinde (part of Third Ypres).	
	Alfred Taylor	1910–12	4	31 July 1917 (29)	near Ypres, Belgium	Served in Royal Army Medical Corps; died at Third Battle of Ypres.	

=== New Zealand ===
Thirteen former New Zealand representatives – known as All Blacks – lost their lives in the First World War, with three (possibly four) of them dying in the Battle of Messines.

- James Alexander Steenson Baird ("Jim Baird"), died on 7 June 1917 in France (probably at Messines), aged 23
- Robert Stanley Black ("Bobby Black"), died on 21 September 1916 at the Somme, aged 23
- Henry Dewar ("Norkey Dewar"), died on 9 August 1915 at Gallipoli, aged 33
- Ernest Henry Dodd ("Ernie Dodd"), died on 11 September 1918 at Havrincourt, aged 38
- Albert Joseph Downing ("Doolan Downing"), died on 8 August 1915 at Gallipoli, aged 28
- David Gallaher ("Dave Gallaher"), died on 4 October 1917 at Passchendaele, aged 43
- Eric Tristram Harper, died on 30 April 1918 in Palestine, aged 40
- James McNeece ("Jim McNeece"), died on 21 June 1917 at Rouen, aged 31
- Alexander James Ridland ("Jimmy Ridland"), died on 5 November 1918 in France, aged 36
- George Maurice Victor Sellars, died on 7 June 1917 at Messines, aged 31
- Reginald Taylor ("Reg Taylor"), died on 20 June 1917 at Messines, aged 28
- Hubert Sydney Turtill ("Jum" Turtill), died on 9 April 1918 in France, aged 38
- Frank Reginald Wilson, died on 19 September 1916 at the Somme, aged 31

=== Scotland ===
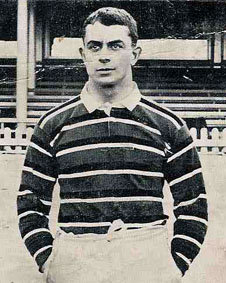
David Bedell-Sivright

According to Allan Massie, "Scotland had suffered more severely than any of the Home Countries from the slaughter of the war. Thirty capped players were lost (twenty six English internationalists were killed)."

While some of these players were clearly retired, others such as Frederick Harding Turner, James Huggan and John George Will had played in the last match before the war, the Calcutta Cup match in March 1914, and so had their playing careers prematurely ended. Walter Sutherland was also considered one of Hawick RFC's greatest players, and was still remembered fondly as "Wattie Suddie" in Bill McLaren's playing days. Few surviving Scots were capped before and after the war – Charlie Usher, Jock Wemyss and Alex Angus are some of the exceptions. Charlie Usher spent much of the war in a POW camp.

- Cecil Halliday Abercrombie, died on 31 May 1916 Aged 30
- David McLaren Bain, died on 3 June 1915, Aged 24
- David Bedell-Sivright ("Darkie Bedell-Sivright"), died on 5 September 1915, Aged 35
- Patrick Charles Bentley Blair, died on 6 July 1915 Aged 24.
- John Argentine Campbell, died on 1 December 1917, Aged 40.
- William Campbell Church, died on 28 June 1915, Aged 32.
- Walter Michael Dickson, died on 26 September 1915, Aged 30.
- John Henry Dods, died on 31 December 1915, Aged 40
- Walter Torrie Forrest, died on 19 April 1917, Aged 36
- Rowland Fraser, died on 1 July 1916, Aged 26.
- William Elphinstone Gordon, died on 30 August 1918, Aged 25
- James Young Milne Henderson, died on 31 July 1917, Aged 26
- David Dickie Howie ("Dave Howie"), died on 19 January 1916, Aged 27
- James Laidlaw Huggan, died on 16 September 1914, Aged 25
- William Ramsay Hutchison, died on 22 March 1918, Aged 29
- George A.W. Lamond, died on 25 February 1918, Aged 39
- Eric Milroy, ("Puss Milroy") died on 18 July 1916 Aged 28.
- Thomas Arthur Nelson, died on 9 April 1917, Aged 40
- James Pearson, died on 22 May 1915, Aged 26
- Lewis Robertson, died on 3 November 1914, Aged 31
- James Ross, died on 31 October 1914, Aged 34
- Andrew Ross, died on 6 April 1916, Aged 36
- Ronald Francis Simson, died on 14 September 1914, Aged 24
- Stephen Sebastian Leonard Steyn, died on 8 December 1917, Aged 28
- Walter Riddell Sutherland ("Wattie Suddie"), died on 4 October 1918, Aged 27
- Frederick Harding Turner, died on 10 January 1915, Aged 26
- Albert Luvian Wade, died on 28 April 1917, Aged 32.
- William Middleton Wallace, died on 22 August 1915, Aged 22
- John George Will, died on 25 March 1917, Aged 24
- John Skinner Wilson, died on 31 May 1916, Aged 32
- Eric Templeton Young, died on 28 June 1915, Aged 23

=== South Africa ===
Adam Burdett was part of the 1906–7 tour to the British Isles. This was the inaugural South Africa tour and is recognised as the event that coined the word "Springboks" as a nickname for the South Africa team. Poignantly, in the two games he played on that tour in November 1906, he shared the field with David Bedell-Sivright of Scotland, and Basil Maclear of Ireland, who were also casualties of that war. Likewise, Toby Moll would probably have rubbed shoulders with Eric Milroy, Noel Humphreys or Phil Waller in the 1910 British Isles tour of South Africa.

Portrait	Player	Playing years	Caps	Date of death (Age)	Place of death	Military service	Ref(s)
	Adam Burdett	1906	2	4 November 1918 (36)	Roberts Heights, Pretoria, Transvaal Province	Burdett served as captain, South African Army Service Corps.	
	Sep Ledger	1912–1913	4	13 April 1917 (26)	Arras, France	Ledger served as Sergeant, South African Infantry, and was killed in action.	
	Toby Moll	1910	1	14 July 1916 (26)	Bazentin le Petit	Moll served first in the South West Africa Campaign, then joined the Leicestershire Regiment in England. Soon after taking Bazentin le Petit in the Battle of Bazentin Ridge, he was hit by shrapnel and died the following day.	
	Jacky Morkel	1912–1913	5	15 May 1916 (25)	German East Africa	Morkel served as a scout with the 1st South African Mounted Brigade in German East Africa. When the rainy season set in, Morkel's unit was cut off and the health of the troops severely deteriorated. Morkel contracted dysentery and died.	
	Tommy Thompson	1912	3	20 June 1916 (29)	Kangata, German East Africa	Thompson served first in the South West Africa Campaign, and then in German East Africa with the 5th Regiment of the South African Infantry. His unit was sent in pursuit of German forces in Kangata, near Pongwe. During the firefight that ensued, Thompson took a bullet through the neck and was killed.	

=== Wales ===
Amongst the fatalities was Richard Garnons Williams, who had played in the first Wales international rugby union match in 1881. At 59 years of age, he was the eldest of the 13 Wales international players to be killed during the war.

Charles Taylor was the first Welsh fatality, and was a noted athlete, especially good at the pole vault.

Fred Perrett is often left out of lists of the Welsh international war dead due to his supposed defection to the professional game.

Portrait	Player	Playing years	Caps	Date of death (Age)	Place of death	Military service	Ref(s)
	Billy Geen	1912–1913	3	31 July 1915 (24)	Hooge, Flanders, Belgium	Geen joined the King's Royal Rifle Corps at the start of WWI. His unit was involved in the failed defence of Hooge against German forces, equipped with flamethrowers. He was killed in action leading his men in hand-to-hand fighting.	
	Bryn Lewis	1912–1913	2	2 April 1917 (26)	Ypres, Belgium		
	Fred Perrett	1912–1913	5	1 December 1918 (27)	Boulogne, France		
	Lou Phillips	1900–1901	4	14 March 1916 (38)	Cambrin, France	Phillips served with the Royal Fusiliers on the Western Front, and while out on a wiring party, he was shot through the chest and killed.	
	Charlie Pritchard			14 August 1916 (34)			
	Charles Taylor			24 January 1915 (51)			
	Dick Thomas			7 July 1916 (35)			
	Horace Thomas			3 September 1916 (26)			
	Phil Waller			14 December 1917 (28)			
	David Watts			14 July 1916 (30)			
	Dai Westacott			27 August 1917 (35)			
	Johnny Williams	1906–1911	17+2	12 July 1916 (34)	Mametz, Somme, France	Serving with the Welsh Regiment, Williams was leading an attack on German positions in Mametz Wood, when he was wounded. He died a few days later.	
	Richard Garnons Williams	1881	1	28 September 1915 (59)	Loos-en-Gohelle, France	Garnons Williams was commissioned into the British Army in 1876, and by 1906 had retired. At the start of WWI, he joined the Royal Fusiliers and was leading the 12th Battalion Royal Fusiliers at the Battle of Loos when he was shot and killed.	

=== United States ===
The captain of the All America side that faced New Zealand in California died in the war.

- Deke Gard, died on 29 September 1918 aged 26, when killed in action during an advance in the Argonne Forest.

== Deaths after the war ==
- Reginald Lloyd (Wales, 4 matches 1913–14) died in Bradford on 20 February 1919 three weeks after his discharge from the Army Service Corps. He already had a cough which developed into influenza and death was from pneumonia and cardiac arrest. The doctor who attended him wrote 'my opinion is that this condition was undoubtedly brought about by his service in the army.' He taught at Bradford Grammar School from January 1912, had played for Oxford University, Pontypool and London Welsh, and he had been selected to represent Yorkshire against New Zealand on 8 March 1919.

Sometimes included are two deaths from war wounds after the war, although both are past the Commonwealth War Graves Commission limit of 31 Aug 1921 (when an order in council declared the war over) to be considered a war death:

- Henry Brougham (England) died 18 February 1923
- Hopkin Maddock (Wales) died 15 December 1921

== See also ==
- List of Olympians killed in World War I
