= 1910–11 Scottish Districts season =

Rugby union competition

- Countries: Scotland
- Date: 1910–11
- Matches played: 1

The 1910–11 Scottish Districts season is a record of all the rugby union matches for Scotland's district teams.

== History ==
Edinburgh District beat Glasgow District in the Inter-City match

This was the first season that the North of Scotland combined side beat the South of Scotland District side.

The Provinces v Anglo-Scots was dropped from the District schedule; and there was to be no South of Scotland v London Scottish match. Instead the South lined up a match against Welsh opposition.

== Results ==
Date	Try	Conversion	Penalty	Dropped goal	Goal from mark	Notes
1905–1947	3 points	2 points	3 points	4 points	3 points	

=== Inter-City ===
3 December 1910

Glasgow District	5 - 26	Edinburgh District
Try: John Dobson; Con: Andrew Greig	Report; Report	Try: Watson x 3 Alex Angus; John MacDonald; Frank Osler; Con: John MacCallum x 4

Hamilton Crescent, Glasgow
Referee: John Tulloch

Glasgow District: Back, Andrew Greig (Glasgow HSFP); three-quarters, R. Lawson (Clydesdale), C. Salvesen (West of Scotland), G. S. Milne (Glasgow University), R. S. Duncan (Glasgow HSFP); half-backs, E. G. Copestake (Clydesdale) and R. Anderson (Glasgow HSFP); forwards. S. McKinnon (Glasgow Academicals), John Dobson (Glasgow Academicals), W. Burrell (Glasgow Academicals), George Frew (Glasgow HSFP), J. S. Leggat (Clydesdale), William Ramsay Hutchison (Glasgow HSFP), Alexander Stevenson (Glasgow University) and R. C. Walker (Clydesdale).
Edinburgh District: Back, A. A. Morrison (Watsonians): threequarters, J. H. D. Watson (Edinburgh Academicals). Alex Angus (Watsonians). James Pearson (Watsonians), and John MacDonald (Edinburgh Wanderers); half-backs, Frank Osler (Edinburgh University), John MacGregor (Edinburgh University); forwards. John MacCallum (Watsonians) [captain], Jock Scott (Edinburgh Academicals), James MacKenzie (Edinburgh University) and Andrew Ross (Edinburgh University). Lewis Robertson (Edinburgh Wanderers), Finlay Kennedy (Stewart's College FP), J. H. Lindsay (Edinburgh Institution), and Archibald Stewart (Edinburgh Academicals).

=== Other Scottish matches ===
19 November 1910
2.15pm

Midlands District	47 - 0	North of Scotland District
	Preview; Report; Report

Forthill, Dundee

Midlands District: O. S. Moodie (Panmure), W.G. Liddel (St Andrews University), C. R. Cleghorn (Panmure), G. M. Cleghorn (Panmure), T. R. Lowson (Dundee HSFP), F. W. Stewart (Panmure), J.G. Tawse (Panmure), Alexander Moodie (St Andrews University), Colin Hill (St Andrews University), H. A. Young (St. Andrews University), Dave Howie (Kirkcaldy), W. Herd (Kirkcaldy), M. W. Nichol (Panmure), R.M. Lindsay (Panmure), N. Keay
North of Scotland District: Saunders (Aberdeen University), back; Shepherd (Aberdeen GSFP), Duffus (Aberdeen GSFP), Brown (Queen's Cross), and McAndrew (Queen's Cross), three-quarters; Johnstone (Aberdeen GSFP) and A. Ledingham (Queen's Cross), half-backs; Snowie (Queen's Cross), Mackintosh (Queen's Cross), Marchant (Queen's Cross), Hogg (Aberdeen University), McAllan (Aberdeen University), Simpson (Aberdeen GSFP), Davidson (Aberdeen GSFP), and Johnstone (Queen's Cross), forwards.

26 November 1910

Royal HSFP	17 - 15	Midlands District
Try: H. Brown; McLaren; Kennedy; Con: Hume x 2 Drop: G. A. Sanderson	Report; Report; Report	Try: Smith x 3 Davidson; Pen: Moodie

Corstorphine
Referee: A. J. Ramage

Royal HSFP:
Midlands District:

10 December 1910

North of Scotland District	9 - 8	South of Scotland District
Try: Tawse x 2 Moodie	Report	Try: Balfour; Con: Billy Burnet; Pen: Billy Burnet

Pittodrie Stadium, Aberdeen
Attendance: 300
Referee: John Dykes

North of Scotland District: O. S. Moodie (Panmure), G. S. Liddel (St Andrews University), C. Cleghorn (Panmure), G. M. Cleghorn (Panmure), A. T. Smith (Kirkcaldy), Tawse (Panmure), Lawson (St Andrews University); Robert Stevenson (St Andrews University) [captain], Alexander Moodie (St Andrews University), Colin Hill (St Andrews University), Dave Howie (Kirkcaldy), J. Simpson (Aberdeen GSFP), A. A. Davidson (Aberdeen GSFP), M. W. Nichol (Panmure), McAllan (Aberdeen University).
South of Scotland District: Borth Todd (Gala), Walter Sutherland (Hawick), Carl Ogilvy (Hawick), Billy Burnet (Hawick), James Huggan (Jed Forest and Edinburgh University); J. B. Henderson (Jed Forest) and D. Shannon (Hawick), Willie Kyle (Hawick), Laing (Hawick), M. Drummond (Jed Forest), J. Jardine (Melrose), C. Clark (Gala), Balfour (Jed Forest), Wight (Jed Forest), Ballantyne (Jed Forest).

=== Trial matches ===
21 January 1911

Blues Trial	19 - 26	Whites Trial
Try: John MacDonald x 3 Ronald Simson; Con: James MacKenzie; John MacCallum; Pen: John MacCallum	Report	Try: J. P. M. Robertson; Frederick Harding Turner; Rowland Fraser x 2 Donald Grant; Andrew Ross; Con: Frederick Harding Turner; Patrick Munro; Drop: Alex Angus

Inverkeithing
Attendance: 3,000
Referee: John Dallas (SRU)

Blues Trial: A. A. Morrison (Watsonians) John MacDonald (Edinburgh Wanderers), Ronald Simson (London Scottish), Carl Ogilvy (Hawick), G. D. Campbell (United Services), Eric Milroy (Watsonians), James Milne Henderson (Watsonians), Robert Stevenson (St Andrews University) [captain], Jock Scott (Edinburgh Academicals), John MacCallum (Watsonians), Louis Moritz Speirs (Watsonians), George Frew (Glasgow HSFP), Charles Stuart (West of Scotland), Alexander Stevenson (Glasgow University), and James MacKenzie (Edinburgh University)
Whites Trial: O. S. Moodie (Panmure), Donald Grant (East Midlands). Fletcher Buchanan (Oxford University), Alex Angus (Watsonians), J. P. M. Robertson (Watsonians), Patrick Munro (London Scottish) [captain], Frank Osler (Edinburgh University), Alexander Moodie (St Andrews University), Frederick Harding Turner (Oxford University), Rowland Fraser (Cambridge University), Lewis Robertson (London Scottish), A. C. Brown (Royal HSFP), John Dobson (Glasgow Academicals), Andrew Ross (Edinburgh University), Colin Hill (St Andrews University)

=== Welsh matches ===
16 November 1910

South of Scotland District	17 - 3	Monmouthshire County
Try: Carl Ogilvy; Douglas; James Huggan; Walter Sutherland; Con: Billy Burnet; Pen: Billy Burnet	Preview; Report	Try: Reg Plummer

Referee: John Dallas (Watsonians)

South of Scotland District: Borth Todd (Gala), Walter Sutherland (Hawick), Billy Burnet (Hawick), Carl Ogilvy (Hawick), James Huggan (Jed Forest and Edinburgh University), W. Douglas (Melrose), T.D. Arthur (Selkirk), Willie Kyle (Hawick), N. Drummond (Jed Forest), A. Irving (Langholm), H.M. McMillan (Selkirk), J. Jardine (Melrose), C. Clarke (Gala), W. C. Balfour (Jed Forest), G. Brown (Hawick)
Monmouth County: W. Haley (Pill Harriers), Reg Plummer (Newport), G. Parkhouse (Pontypool), W. Bowen (Abertillery), Tommy Vile (Newport), Walter Martin (Newport), W. J. Evans (Brynmawr), Harry Jarman (Pontypool), C. W. Pritchard (Newport), Enoch Davis (Blaenavon), R. Edwards (Newport), R. Jenkins (Abertillery), P. Jones (Newport), W. Trump (Pill Harriers)

=== International matches ===
No touring matches this season.
