= List of Wales rugby union footballers killed in the world wars =

This is a list of Wales international rugby union footballers killed in the world wars:

== First World War ==
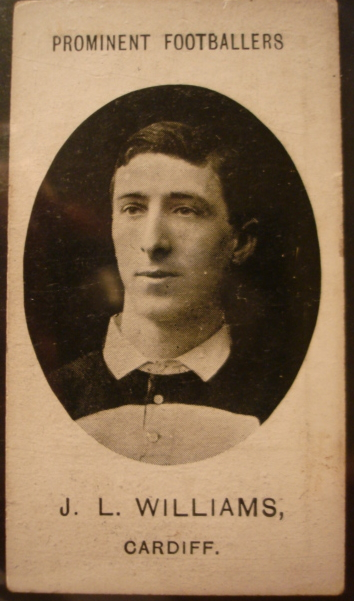
Johnnie Williams the most capped player to be killed

Thirteen were killed in the First World War (Palenski also includes Hopkin Maddock who died on 15 December 1921 from war wounds)

- Billy Geen (3 caps)
- Bryn Lewis (2 caps)
- Fred Perrett (5 caps)
- Lou Phillips (4 caps)
- Charlie Pritchard (14 caps)
- C. G. Taylor (9 caps)
- E. J. Thomas (4 caps)
- Horace Thomas (2 caps)
- Phil Waller (6 caps)
- David Watts (4 caps)
- Dai Westacott (1 cap)
- Johnnie L. Williams (17 caps)
- Richard Garnons Williams (1 cap)

== Second World War ==
Three were killed in the Second World War:

- Cecil Davies (1 cap)
- John R. Evans (1 cap)
- Maurice J. L. Turnbull (2 caps)

== See also ==
- List of international rugby union players killed in World War I
- List of Scotland rugby union players killed in World War I
