= Colin Hill =

Colin Hill may refer to:

- Colin Hill (footballer) (born 1963), Northern Irish footballer
- Colin Hill (priest) (born 1942), Anglican priest and author
- Colin Hill (rugby union) (1887–1953), Scottish rugby union player
