= Walter Sutherland =

Walter Sutherland may refer to:

- Walter Sutherland (Norn) (died 1850), last native speaker of Norn
- Walter Sutherland (rugby union) (1890–1918), Scottish rugby union footballer
