= Patrick Blair =

Patrick Blair may refer to:

- Patrick Blair (rugby union) (1891–1915), Scottish rugby union player
- Patrick Blair (surgeon) (c. 1670–1728), Scottish surgeon, anatomist and botanist
