= Jimmy Dobson =

Scotland international rugby union player

- Born: James Donald Dobson; 23 November 1888 Cathcart, Glasgow, Scotland
- Died: 14 March 1962 (aged 73) Glasgow, Scotland
- Notable relative(s): John Dobson, brother

Rugby union career
- Position: Wing
Amateur team(s)
Years	Team	Apps	(Points)
- Glasgow Academicals
Provincial / State sides
Years	Team	Apps	(Points)
- Glasgow District
International career
Years	Team	Apps	(Points)
1910	Scotland	1	(3)

Jimmy Dobson (23 November 1888 – 14 March 1962) was a Scotland international rugby union player. He played at the Wing position.

== Rugby Union career ==
=== Amateur career ===
Dobson played for Glasgow Academicals.

=== Provincial career ===
He was capped by Glasgow District in 1906.

=== International career ===
Dobson was capped by Scotland for just one match.
