= René Boudreaux =

France international rugby union player (1880–1915)

- Born: René Emile Henri Boudreaux; 27 November 1880 Paris, France
- Died: 8 September 1915 (aged 34) Aubérive, France
- Height: 5 ft 10 in (1.78 m)
- Weight: 181 lb (82 kg)

Rugby union career
- Position: prop forward
Amateur team(s)
Years	Team	Apps	(Points)
1907–1910	SCUF		
1910–12	Racing Club de France		
International career
Years	Team	Apps	(Points)
1910	France	2	(0)
- Military career
- Allegiance: France
- Branch: (France) French Army
- Rank: Lieutenant
- Unit: 103e régiment d'infanterie

René Emile Henri Boudreaux (27 November 1880 – 8 September 1915) was a French rugby union player.

Boudreaux was born in Paris and played as a prop forward for Sporting Club Universitaire de France. He was twice capped for France in the 1910 Five Nations Championship. He made his first appearance at Swansea against Wales on New Year's Day and his second and last against Scotland at Inverleith on 22 January.

During the First World War Boudreaux was recalled to serve in the French Army. He was killed in action near Aubérive while serving as a lieutenant with the 103rd Infantry Regiment of the 7th Infantry Division.

== Rugby career ==
Boudreaux was a fencer as well as playing rugby.

Boudreaux played for the SCUF as a forward until 1910.

He was on the bench for the trials match of 20 December 1908 between the Probables and the Possibles.

The Five Nations Championship first came into being in 1910 when France joined the annual Home Nations tournament. Boudreaux played in two of the four games, against Wales and Scotland, in both of which the French were heavily defeated.

He trialled for the national team in the following season, playing on the side of the Possibles against the Probables on 18 December 1910.

For the season 1910–11, Boudreaux moved to RCF. He was selected to represent Paris in the match against London on 12 March, replacing Cadenat, who was unavailable to play.

He continued to fence after ceasing to play rugby.

=== International appearances ===
Opposition	Score	Result	Date	Venue	Ref(s)
Wales	49–14	Lost	1 January 1910	Swansea, Wales	
Scotland	27–0	Lost	22 January 1910	Inverleith, Scotland	

== See also ==
- List of international rugby union players killed in action during the First World War
