= Robert Stevenson (rugby union, born 1886) =

British Lions & Scotland international rugby union player

Robert C. Stevenson
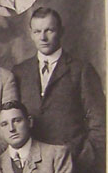
- Robert C Stevenson with the British Isles team in 1910
- Born: Robert C. Stevenson; 12 February 1886 Perth, Scotland
- Died: 4 September 1973 (aged 87) Durban, South Africa
- Weight: 92 kg (203 lb; 14 st 7 lb)
- School: Kirkcaldy High School
- University: St Andrews University
- Occupation: Medical Doctor

Rugby union career
- Position: Forward
Amateur team(s)
Years	Team	Apps	(Points)
- St Andrews University
Provincial / State sides
Years	Team	Apps	(Points)
1910	North of Scotland District		
1911	Blues Trial		
International career
Years	Team	Apps	(Points)
1910	Scotland	3	(0)
1910	British and Irish Lions		
c.1910	Barbarians		

Dr. Robert C. Stevenson (17 February 1886 – 4 September 1973) was a Scotland international rugby union player. He also represented the Barbarians and the British and Irish Lions.

== Rugby Union career ==
=== Amateur career ===
He played rugby union for St Andrews University.

=== Provincial career ===
He played for the combined North of Scotland District against the South of Scotland District on 10 December 1910.

He played for the Blues Trial side against the Whites Trial side on 21 January 1911 and captained the side, while still with St. Andrews University.

=== International career ===
He played 6 matches for Scotland.

He was a member of the 1910 British Lions tour to South Africa, and played in 15 games, including three of the Test matches against the South African national team.

He also played for the Barbarians.

== Medical career ==
Stevenson attended Kirkcaldy High School, and went to the University of St Andrews, where he studied medicine. He then became a doctor.
