= Donald Grant (rugby union) =

Scotland international rugby union player

- Born: Donald Macpherson Grant; 30 December 1892 Burma
- Died: 8 December 1962 (aged 69) San Francisco, United States

Rugby union career
- Position: Wing
Amateur team(s)
Years	Team	Apps	(Points)
- London Scottish
Provincial / State sides
Years	Team	Apps	(Points)
- East Midlands
1911	Whites Trial		
International career
Years	Team	Apps	(Points)
1911	Scotland	2	(0)

Donald Grant (30 December 1892 – 8 December 1962) was an international rugby union player representing Scotland. Grant played as a Wing.

== Rugby Union career ==
=== Amateur career ===
Grant played for London Scottish.

=== Provincial career ===
Grant played for the English county team East Midlands.

He played for the Whites Trial side against the Blues Trial side on 21 January 1911, while still with London Scottish, scoring a try in the match in a 26-19 win for the Whites.

=== International career ===
Grant played 2 matches for Scotland, both in the Five Nations tournament.

He remains the youngest player to play on the Wing for Scotland. His first start was at the age of 18 years and 36 days.

His debut was against Wales on 4 February 1911 at Inverleith. Wales won the match 32 - 10. The Glasgow Herald noted that Grant as 'the schoolboy member of the team, took a long time to find his feet, and did his best work in Scotland's last despairing rally.'

His final match was against Ireland on 25 February 1911 at Inverleith. Ireland won the match 16 - 10. Grant had a kick at goal in the first half but it went right of the post; and his similar conversion kick in the second half also missed. Nevertheless he combined with Carl Ogilivy to good effect throughout the match.
