= Billy Burnet =

Scotland international rugby union player & referee

- Born: William Alexander Burnet; 6 March 1886 Hawick, Scotland
- Died: 25 July 1958 (aged 72)

Rugby union career
- Position: Centre
Amateur team(s)
| Years | Team | Apps | (Points) |
- Hawick Teviot Union
- Hawick
Provincial / State sides
| Years | Team | Apps | (Points) |
| 1910 | South of Scotland | | |
International career
| Years | Team | Apps | (Points) |
| 1912 | Scotland | 1 | (0) |
Refereeing career
| Years | Competition | | Apps |
| 1919-37 | Scottish Districts | | |

Billy Burnet (6 March 1886 – 25 July 1958) was a Scotland international rugby union player. He played as a Centre. He later became a rugby union referee.

== Rugby Union career ==
=== Amateur career ===
He began playing rugby for Hawick Teviot Union.

He played for Hawick.

=== Provincial career ===
Burnet played for the South of Scotland in 1910.

=== International career ===
He was capped once for Scotland in 1912.

The Hawick News and Border Chronicle on 9 May 1913 detailed the end of season Hawick speech which remarked on Burnet's brief international career:

Their vice-captain, Billy Burnet, had given them a few years of excellent service. Like the captain, he too had been capped on which occasion he had come out of the ordeal with flying colours. Had been playing inside to Sutherland against South Africa, was safe to say that Sutherland's great efforts that day have borne fruit.

=== Referee career ===
When his playing career finished, Burnet took up refereeing rugby union matches.

Remarking on his retirement from the game in 1937, the Hawick Express stated:

Billy Burnet whose pre-war days gave great service to our Club took up refereeing in 1919, and was not long in proving that he was as capable a referee as he had been as a player. He was, season after season, in great demand for all big club matches, and was also given control of Trial and International games. At the close of last season he decided to retire, and at the annual general meeting of the Scottish Rugby Union it was gratifying to hear the President. Mr. A. A. Lawrie. pay tribute to the splendid work done for Scottish Rugby by Billy's great efficiency as a referee. I think his maxim must have been "Firmness, fairness and fitness". Mr. Burnet has always been of great assistance to his home club, and he now will be able to watch the Greens and give us advice on how to improve our team's position in the Scottish rugby world.
