= John George Will =

Scotland international rugby union player

- Born: John George Will; 22 September 1892 Merton, Surrey, England
- Died: 25 March 1917 (aged 24) Hauts-de-France, France
- School: Merchant Taylors'
- University: Downing College, Cambridge

Rugby union career
Amateur team(s)
Years	Team	Apps	(Points)
- Cambridge University RUFC
International career
Years	Team	Apps	(Points)
1912-14	Scotland	7	

John George Will (22 September 1892 – 25 March 1917), nicknamed the "Flying Scot," was a Scottish rugby union player and a Lieutenant in the Royal Flying Corps killed in World War I.

== Early life and rugby career ==
Will was born in Merton, Surrey, the son of Scottish physician John Kennedy Will (from Cullen, Moray) and Ella Ryng Will (from St Helens, Lancashire). He was educated at Merchant Taylors' School (1905–1911). He then went to Downing College, Cambridge where he studied medicine as an exhibitioner and played for Cambridge University RFC. He had seven caps for Scotland in 1912–1914, and he was dubbed the "Flying Scot" for his playing style. Will had played in the last match before the war, the Calcutta Cup match at Inverleith against England, alongside James Huggan who died in 1914, and Frederick Harding Turner and Eric Templeton Young, who died in 1915.

== War service and death ==
Will joined the Honourable Artillery Company when the war began in August 1914 and was sent to France the following month. The following April he was commissioned into the Worcestershire Hussars and then switched to the Leinster Regiment the next month. In August 1915, he was wounded in action near Hooge, Belgium. He joined the Royal Flying Corps that November and earned his pilot's certificate in England in June 1916. He remained in England as an instructor in Dover before returning to the front in February 1917 with the No. 29 Squadron.

Few official details are available concerning Will's death. According to Nigel McCrery, who wrote the book Into Touch: Rugby Internationals Killed in the Great War, on the morning of 25 March 1917, Will took off from Le Hameau in a Nieuport 17 A6751 in a five-plane escort mission, and he and Lieutenant Christopher Guy Gilbert (aka the Dorset Flyer) never made it back. They were apparently attacked by the Red Baron's Flying Circus. Gilbert was shot down by the Baron, while Will was shot by the baron's brother Lothar von Richthofen.

Will's grave was found in December 1917, after the Allied forces made inroads into German-held territory. He was buried with a cross made from a broken propeller:

"Round the propeller-hub is painted '2nd Lt J G Will RFC'. He was the wing-three quarter known before the war as 'the flying Scot' ... the grave must have been made by Boche airmen – a curiously chivalrous act, for they can hardly have thought it likely that we would advance far enough to see it.

— 2nd Lt Huntley Gordon, personal correspondence

Will's remains were not reburied. He is commemorated at the Arras Flying Services Memorial.

== Commemoration ==
On 25 March 2017 A commemoration ceremony was held in the Memorial Garden of Merchant Taylors' School. A 36-page booklet giving full biographical details was produced. Unique to the commemoration was that Will's nephew, Roger Hamer, was traced and was able to attend. He donated much memorabilia, including a fragment from Will's propeller, that is now stored at the school archives.
