= John Dobson (rugby union, born 1886) =

Scotland international rugby union player

- Born: John Dobson; 6 September 1886 Glasgow, Scotland
- Died: 16 July 1936 (aged 49) Glasgow, Scotland
- Notable relative(s): Jimmy Dobson, brother

Rugby union career
- Position: Hooker
Amateur team(s)
Years	Team	Apps	(Points)
- Glasgow Academicals
Provincial / State sides
Years	Team	Apps	(Points)
1910	Cities District		
1910	Glasgow District		
1911	Whites Trial		
1912	Blues Trial		
International career
Years	Team	Apps	(Points)
1911-12	Scotland	6	(0)

John Dobson (6 September 1886 – 16 July 1936) was a Scotland international rugby union player. He played at the Hooker position.

== Rugby Union career ==
=== Amateur career ===
After studying at Glasgow Academy, Dobson then played for Glasgow Academicals. He captained the side for two years.

=== Provincial career ===
He played for the Cities District on 8 January 1910.

He was capped by Glasgow District in 1910.

He played for the Whites Trial side against the Blues Trial side on 21 January 1911, while still with Glasgow Academicals.

He was lined up to play again for the Whites Trial side against the Blues Trial side on 21 December 1912 but an injury to G. Donald from Oxford University created a berth for him instead in the Blues. The Blues won the match 27- 8. Days later Donald announced his retirement from rugby union. He never received a Scotland cap.

=== International career ===
Dobson was capped by Scotland for 6 matches from 1911 to 1912.

== Military career ==
He served in the First World War. He was a captain with the 3/5th Scottish Rifles (Cameronians); and then the 17th Battalion King's Royal Rifle Corps. Severely wounded he was awarded the Military Cross.

== Business career ==
Dobson was a woollen merchant and manufacturer; Dobson and his brothers were partners in the firm David Black and Company. On Dobson's death in 1936 it was stated that this woollen business was founded 150 years before.

Dobson became a director of Wylie and Lochhead Ltd; a governor of the Glasgow Academicals War Memorial Trust; a member of Merchants House; a member of the Glasgow Liberal Club; and treasurer of Kelvinside Parish Church.

== Family ==
One of his brothers, Jimmy Dobson, was also a Scotland international rugby union player. Another brother, Edward Dobson, died in Flanders in 1917 in the First World War. A remaining brother William Sharp Dobson worked in the woollen business in the warehouse. He also had two sisters, Jane Boyd Dobson and Charlotte Sharp Dobson. All of the brothers played for Glasgow District in the inter-city match against Edinburgh District.

Dobson married Florence Marie Williamson in September 1920. They had two daughters.

== Death ==
Dobson died suddenly in July 1936. Newspaper reports state the death was on Friday 17 July; the National Probate Index of Scotland states 16 July. The National Probate Index of Scotland date of death is taken here.

He left a sizeable estate of £50,493, 16 shillings and 8 pence. Both of his surviving brothers and his wife were executors of his estate.

The Belfast Telegraph stated that he was one of the finest forwards in the immediate pre-war years of Scottish rugby.
