= George Frew =

Scotland international rugby union player

- Born: George Mitchell Frew; 9 September 1883 Larkhall, South Lanarkshire, Scotland
- Died: 6 April 1942 (aged 58) Bothwell, Scotland

Rugby union career
- Position: Forward
Amateur team(s)
Years	Team	Apps	(Points)
- Glasgow HSFP
–	Barbarians		
Provincial / State sides
Years	Team	Apps	(Points)
- Glasgow District
1911	Blues Trial		
International career
Years	Team	Apps	(Points)
1906-11	Scotland	15	(3)

George Frew (9 September 1883 – 6 April 1942) was a Scotland international rugby union player. He played as a Forward position.

== Rugby Union career ==
=== Amateur career ===
Frew played for Glasgow HSFP. He was also capped by the Barbarians.

=== Provincial career ===
He was capped by Glasgow District in 1906.

He played for the Blues Trial side against the Whites Trial side on 21 January 1911 while still with Glasgow HSFP.

=== International career ===
Frew was capped by Scotland 15 times. He captained the Scotland side against Wales in 1910.
