= John MacCallum =

Scotland international rugby union player

- Born: John Cameron MacCallum; 11 October 1883 Strontian, Scotland
- Died: 29 November 1957 (aged 74) Edinburgh, Scotland

Rugby union career
- Position: Forward
Amateur team(s)
Years	Team	Apps	(Points)
- Watsonians
Provincial / State sides
Years	Team	Apps	(Points)
1910	Edinburgh District		
1911	Blues Trial		
International career
Years	Team	Apps	(Points)
1903	Scotland	26	(24)

John MacCallum (11 October 1883 – 29 November 1957) was a Scotland international rugby union player.

== Rugby Union career ==
=== Amateur career ===
He played for Watsonians.

=== Provincial career ===
He represented Edinburgh District in 1910, captaining the side.

He played for the Blues Trial side against the Whites Trial side on 21 January 1911 while still with Watsonians.

=== International career ===
He played 26 times for Scotland, scoring 2 tries and 9 conversions for a total of 24 points.

== Medical career ==
MacCallum became a doctor. He became an assistant surgeon for the Royal Sick Children Hospital in Glasgow.

He was a conscientious objector in the First World War. His medical training meant he was assigned a post in the army. At the time he was an Executive Tuberculosis officer for the County of Argyll. He had applied for his conscientious objector status but it had not come through. He was supposed to report to Stirling Castle for his conscription on 30 May 1916 and his non attendance found him in front of a judge in Oban Sheriff Court. MacCallum plead not guilty in view of his conscientious objection but the Sheriff found him guilty and gave him a choice of week's imprisonment or a £2 fine. The headline in The Scotsman "Fined as an absentee" indicated that MacCallum opted for the fine.
