= Carl Ogilvy =

Scotland international rugby union player

Carl Oglivy
- Born: Charles Ogilvy; 13 June 1889 Edinburgh, Scotland
- Died: c.1936 (aged 46–47)

Rugby union career
- Position: Full Back
Amateur team(s)
Years	Team	Apps	(Points)
1911-12	Hawick		
1912-	Kelso		
Provincial / State sides
Years	Team	Apps	(Points)
1910	South of Scotland		
1911	Blues Trial		
International career
Years	Team	Apps	(Points)
1911-12	Scotland	3	(0)

Carl Ogilvy (13 June 1889 – c. 1936) was a Scotland international rugby union player. He played as a Full Back.

== Rugby Union career ==
=== Amateur career ===
He played for Hawick in 1911–12; and then moved to play for Kelso.

During this time at Kelso, he captained the side for two seasons from 1912 to 1914. He captained the Kelso sevens side that won the Jed-Forest Sevens.

=== Provincial career ===
Ogilvy played for the South of Scotland in 1910.

He played for the Blues Trial side against the Whites Trial side on 21 January 1911 while still with Hawick.

=== International career ===
He was capped 3 times for Scotland from 1911 to 1912.

From The Scottish Referee of 26 February 1912:

We have every reason to expect that Ogilvy will be retained as Scotland's back in the game with England three weeks hence. Although perhaps not quite so brilliant. as when he played at Twickenham last season, Ogilvy nevertheless gave a good display against Ireland, and while his kicking was not all that could have been desired, his following up and tackling could not have been improved upon. Possessed of good pace. Ogilvy must always prove a sound investment for the full back position so long as he keeps well.

== Business career ==
His father Charles Ogilvy from Kirriemuir took over the business Lugton and Porteous, a drapery, tailor and dressmaking business. Charles Ogilvy died in October 1913 and Carl then had to suspend his playing career in December 1913 to take over the business.

== Family ==
Carl Ogilvy's son Eric Ogilvy also played for Kelso. The newspaper states Carl Ogilvy to be deceased prior to 20 December 1939. Carl was still alive at 17 February 1936, his absence remarked at an SRU function as unable to be present.
