= Paul Dupré =

France international rugby union player

Paul Edouard Dupré
- Born: 29 June 1888 Gagny, France
- Died: 31 May 1916 (aged 27) near Dornitz, German Empire
- Height: 1.75 m (5 ft 9 in)
- Weight: 75 kg (11 st 11 lb)

Rugby union career
- Position: Forward
Senior career
Years	Team	Apps	(Points)
- Racing Club de France
International career
Years	Team	Apps	(Points)
1909	France	1	(0)
- Military career
- Allegiance: France
- Rank: Private
- Unit: 4ème Zouaves
- Memorials: Monument au Morts 1914–1918, Gagny

Paul Dupré (29 June 1888 – 31 May 1916) (Note: McCrery states 31 March, but original documents show 31 May.) was a French rugby player, who represented Racing Club de France and was selected for France for one match.

He was born in Gagny. In the First World War he was a private in the 4ème Zouaves regiment of the French Army, and died from wounds in the German prisoner-of-war camp at Altengrabow.

== Early life ==
Paul Dupré was born on 29 June 1888 in Gagny, France.

== Rugby career ==
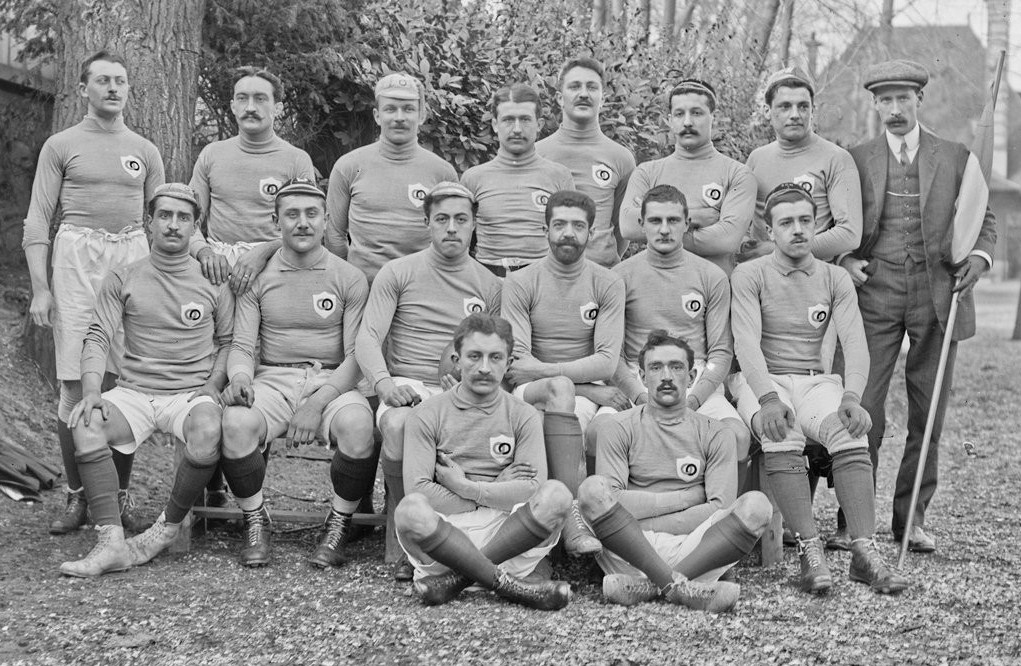
French rugby team for France v Wales, 23 February 1909, Colombes, France

Dupré played for Racing Club de France, and earned selection on one occasion for France, in the 1909 fixture against Wales at Colombes. The French were beaten 5–47, having lost the first encounter between the two countries, the previous year in Cardiff 36–4.

=== International appearances ===
Opposition	Score	Result	Date	Venue	Ref(s)
Wales	5–47	Lost	23 February 1909	Colombes	

== Military service ==
In the First World War, Dupré was a soldat deuxième classe with the 4ème Zouaves light infantry regiment of the French Army. He was captured by the Germans, and died of his wounds in a prisoner-of-war camp in Altengrabow, Germany, on 31 May 1916. He is commemorated on the Monument au Morts 1914–1918 in his birthplace, Gagny, France.

== See also ==
- List of international rugby union players killed in action during the First World War
