= Alexander Moodie =

Scotland international rugby union player

- Born: Alexander Reid Moodie; 30 September 1886 Dundee, Scotland
- Died: 21 May 1968 (aged 81) St Andrews, Scotland

Rugby union career
- Position: Forward
Amateur team(s)
Years	Team	Apps	(Points)
- St. Andrews University
Provincial / State sides
Years	Team	Apps	(Points)
1910	Midlands District		
1910	North of Scotland District		
1911	Whites Trial		
International career
Years	Team	Apps	(Points)
1909-11	Scotland	3	(0)

Alexander Moodie (30 September 1886 – 21 May 1968) was a Scottish international rugby union player who played for University of St Andrews RFC in St Andrews, Fife.

== Early life ==
Born in Balmuirfield, Dundee in 1886, the son of David Moodie, a bleacher, Moodie attended the High School of Dundee and the University of St Andrews.

== Rugby Union career ==
=== Amateur career ===
Moodie played rugby union for St. Andrews University.

=== Provincial career ===
He played for the Midlands District in their match against North of Scotland District on 19 November 1910.

He played for the combined North of Scotland District against the South of Scotland District on 10 December 1910.

He played for the Whites Trial side against the Blues Trial side on 21 January 1911, while still playing with St. Andrews University.

=== International career ===
Moodie played in 3 tests for Scotland. The first was in the last Home Nations tournament in 1909. He played against England on 20 March 1909 in Richmond, London. Scotland won the match 18-8.

His next two matches were against France in the new Five Nations tournament of 1910 and 1911. He played against France on 22 January 1910 at Inverleith. Scotland won that match 27-0. His last match for Scotland was in Colombes, France on 2 January 1911. France won that match 16-15.
