= Rowland Fraser =

Scotland international rugby union player

- Born: 10 January 1890 Perth, Scotland
- Died: 1 July 1916 (aged 26) Somme, France
- School: Merchiston Castle School
- University: Pembroke College, Cambridge

Rugby union career
- Position: Forward
Amateur team(s)
Years	Team	Apps	(Points)
1908-10	Cambridge University		
Provincial / State sides
Years	Team	Apps	(Points)
1911	Whites Trial		
International career
Years	Team	Apps	(Points)
1911	Scotland	4	
- Military career
- Allegiance: United Kingdom
- Branch: British Army
- Rank: Captain
- Unit: 6 Rifle Brigade
- Conflicts: Battle of the Somme
- Memorials: Thiepval Memorial

Rowland Fraser (10 January 1890 – 1 July 1916) was a rugby union player, who played as a forward for Scotland, and also for Cambridge University RFC.

Born in Perth, Scotland, he went to Pembroke College, Cambridge in 1908, where he played in the Varsity Matches of 1908, 1909 and, as captain, 1910. He was selected to play for Scotland in 1911, losing all games of the Five Nations Championship.

At the start of the First World War, he was commissioned into the Rifle Brigade, and was eventually promoted to captain in November 1915. Soon after getting married in June 1916, his regiment participated in the Battle of the Somme, and he was killed in action on the first day, hit by a bullet and shrapnel. He is remembered on the Thiepval Memorial to the missing of the Somme.

== Early life ==
Rowland Fraser was born in Perth, Scotland on 10 January 1890. He attended Merchiston Preparatory School from 1900 to 1903, then Merchiston Castle School from 1903 to 1908, before going to Pembroke College, Cambridge.

== Rugby Union career ==
=== Amateur career ===
Fraser was selected to represent Cambridge University in the Varsity Matches of 1908, 1909 and, as captain, 1910. The first of these was a draw, but Cambridge lost the next two.

=== Provincial career ===
He played for the Whites Trial side against the Blues Trial side on 21 January 1911, while still with Cambridge University.

=== International career ===
He was then picked to play for Scotland in 1911, playing his debut against France. Scotland lost all four games of the 1911 Five Nations Championship, and was the first international side to be defeated by France. Fraser and Frederick Harding Turner were the only two forwards to play in all four. According to E. H. D. Sewell, the contemporary rugby journalist, he was not to blame for his lack of wins, being a "hard-working [forward]... a good dribbler, and a magnificent tackler."

==== International appearances ====
Opposition	Score	Result	Date	Venue	Ref(s)
France	16–15	Lost	2 January 1911	Colombes	
Wales	10–32	Lost	4 February 1911	Inverleith	
Ireland	10–16	Lost	25 February 1911	Inverleith	
England	13–8	Lost	18 March 1911	Twickenham	

== Military career ==
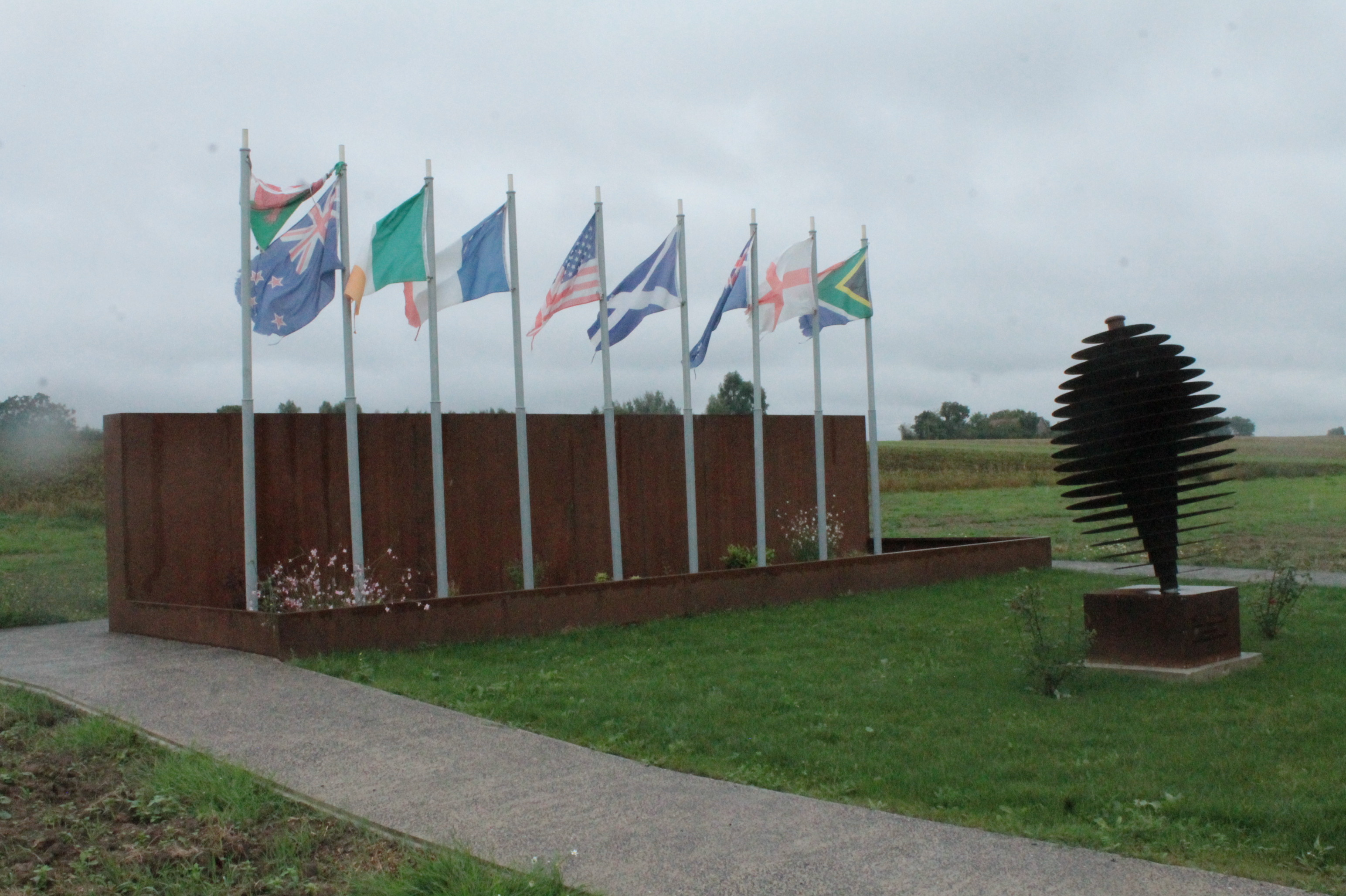
Memorial to the 133 rugby players killed in the Great War, at Fromelles

Fraser was commissioned into the Rifle Brigade on 15 August 1914. He trained with the 6th Battalion at Sheerness, until he crossed to France with his unit on 4 January 1915. He was promoted to lieutenant in August 1915, and to captain in November. In June 1916, Fraser returned home on four days leave, and was married on 20 June to May Dorothy Ross of New South Wales, Australia returning the following day to France. Ten days later, Fraser was killed in action in the Battle of the Somme on 1 July 1916. He was leading his company in an assault on German positions, when he was hit by a machine-gun bullet. His orderly got him into a shell-hole and dressed his wound but was then struck by shrapnel.

He is remembered on the Thiepval Memorial to the missing of the Somme (Pier and Face 16 B and 16 C) and on the memorial to the 133 rugby players killed in the Great War at Fromelles in north France.

== See also ==
- List of international rugby union players killed in action during the First World War
