= John MacDonald (rugby union, born 1890) =

Scottish rugby union player (1890–1980)

- Born: John MacKinnon MacDonald; 7 December 1890
- Died: 1 June 1980 (aged 89) Portree, Scotland

Rugby union career
- Position: Wing
Amateur team(s)
Years	Team	Apps	(Points)
- Edinburgh Wanderers
Provincial / State sides
Years	Team	Apps	(Points)
1910	Edinburgh District		
1911	Blues Trial		
International career
Years	Team	Apps	(Points)
1911	Scotland	1	(0)

John MacDonald (7 December 1890 – 1 June 1980) was a Scotland international rugby union player.

== Rugby Union career ==
=== Amateur career ===
He played club rugby for Edinburgh Wanderers.

=== Provincial career ===
He played for Edinburgh District against Glasgow District in the 1910 inter-city match. Edinburgh won the match 26–5, with MacDonald scoring a try.

He played for the Blues Trial side against the Whites Trial side on 21 January 1911, while still with Edinburgh Wanderers. He scored 3 tries for the Blues, but it could not prevent a 26–19 win for the Whites.

=== International career ===
He was capped once for the Scotland international rugby union team in 1911.
