= Frank Osler =

Scotland international rugby union player

- Born: Francis Lionel Osler; 10 February 1888 Riversdale, Western Cape, South Africa
- Died: 17 January 1935 (aged 46)

Rugby union career
- Position: Scrum-half
Amateur team(s)
| Years | Team | Apps | (Points) |
- Edinburgh University
Provincial / State sides
| Years | Team | Apps | (Points) |
| 1910 | Edinburgh District | | |
| 1911 | Whites Trial | | |
International career
| Years | Team | Apps | (Points) |
| 1911 | Scotland | 2 | (0) |

Frank Osler (10 February 1888 – 17 January 1935) was a Scotland international rugby union player. He played at the Scrum-half position.

== Rugby Union career ==
=== Amateur career ===
Osler played rugby union for Edinburgh University.

At the end of the 1912-13 The Scottish Referee remarked on the Edinburgh University side's season:

Edinburgh University had quite a good season, but it ought to have been much better, and there is a general feeling that F. Osler should never have been dropped from the side, while the centre three-quarters were chopped and changed too frequently. The finish was disappointing, a share of the championship being let slip by successive defeats, when weakly represented, from Edinburgh Academicals and Hawick.

=== Provincial career ===
Osler played in the Inter-City match on 3 December 1910 for Edinburgh District against Glasgow District.

He played for the Whites Trial side against the Blues Trial side on 21 January 1911 while still with Edinburgh University.

He injured his ribs playing in the trial match, but there was no fracture and he was expected to then play for Scotland against Wales in the upcoming international match.

=== International career ===
Osler was capped by Scotland for 2 matches in 1911.
