= Alexander Stevenson (rugby union) =

Scotland international rugby union player

- Born: Alexander McEwen Stevenson; 30 October 1885 Glasgow, Scotland
- Died: 23 April 1963 (aged 77) Greenwich, New South Wales, Australia

Rugby union career
- Position: Forward
Amateur team(s)
Years	Team	Apps	(Points)
- Glasgow University
Provincial / State sides
Years	Team	Apps	(Points)
- Glasgow District
1911	Blues Trial		
International career
Years	Team	Apps	(Points)
1911	Scotland	1	(0)

Alexander Stevenson (30 October 1885 – 23 April 1963) was a Scotland international rugby union player. He played at the Forward position.

== Rugby Union career ==
=== Amateur career ===
Stevenson played for Glasgow University RFC.

=== Provincial career ===
Stevenson played in the Inter-City match on 3 December 1910 for Glasgow District against Edinburgh District.

He played for the Blues Trial side against the Whites Trial side on 21 January 1911 while still with Glasgow University.

=== International career ===
Stevenson was capped by Scotland for just one match. This was the Five Nations match against France on 2 January 1911. France won the match 16 - 15.
