= Willie Kyle =

Scotland international rugby union player

- Born: William Elliot Kyle; 13 July 1881 Hawick, Scottish Borders, Scotland
- Died: 11 December 1959 (aged 78)

Rugby union career
- Position: Forward
Amateur team(s)
Years	Team	Apps	(Points)
- Hawick RFC
International career
Years	Team	Apps	(Points)
1902-10	Scotland	21	

William Elliot Kyle (13 July 1881, Hawick, Scotland – 11 December 1959 (aged 78)) was a Scottish rugby union player, who played as a forward.

He was capped twenty one times for Scotland between 1902 and 1910. He also played for Hawick RFC.
