= David McLaren Bain =

Scotland international rugby union player

- Born: 10 September 1891; Edinburgh, Scotland
- Died: 3 June 1915 (aged 23); France
- Cause of death: In action in World War I
- Occupation: Rugby union player
- Parents: William Bain (father); Edith Frederika McLaren Bain (mother)

Capt. David McLaren Bain (10 September 1891 – 3 June 1915) was a Scotland rugby union player.

Bain was born in Edinburgh, to William Bain and Edith Frederika McLaren Bain. He played for Oxford University RFC and was capped for Scotland in 1911–14. Bain captained Scotland against Wales in 1914.

He was killed in France in World War I, while serving with the Gordon Highlanders.

== See also ==
- List of international rugby union players killed in action during the First World War
