= Jock Wemyss =

Scotland international rugby union player

- Born: Andrew Wemyss; 22 May 1893 Galashiels, Scottish Borders, Scotland
- Died: 21 January 1974 (aged 80) Edinburgh, Scotland

Rugby union career
Amateur team(s)
Years	Team	Apps	(Points)
- Brunstane RFC
- Haddington RFC
International career
Years	Team	Apps	(Points)
1914, 1920, 1922	Scotland	7	(0)

Andrew "Jock" Wemyss (pronounced "Weemz") (22 May 1893 in Galashiels – 21 January 1974 in Edinburgh) was a Scottish rugby union player, who played at prop. Wemyss lost one of his eyes in World War I, but continued to play after the war (games were suspended during the conflict). In his memoires John M. Bannerman wrote "When my International Career began in 1921, the immediate post-war sides had been made up of old salts and old soldiers like Jock Wemyss, Finlay Kennedy, Charlie Usher and A.T. Sloan- men who would have played scores of Internationals had they not been fighting the greater battles of the First War. Wemyss to me is the symbol of the Scottish forward, a man who in his play, his written commentaries on the game and his patriotic enthusiasm epitomises all that is best in the spirit of rugby"

== Rugby Union career ==
=== Amateur career ===
Wemyss played for Brunstane in Edinburgh.

From the Musselburgh News of 5 March 1920:

Mr Andrew Wemyss, who resides in Joppa, and is a former member of the Brunstane Rugby Football Club, has been selected by the Scottish Rugby Football Union to take part in the international match against England. It is the third international honour which has fallen to the lot of this player.

Scotland won 2, lost 3 and drew 3 of the 7 games in which Wemyss played

He became a founder member of two rugby union clubs; first Haddington and then Co-Optimists.

Wemyss, together with George St Claire Murray, a rugby enthusiast from the Watsonians club, founded the Co-Optimists invitational rugby club in 1924. This came after an invitation game against Haddington, a club Wemyss had been a founder member of at the age of 17.

Wemyss went on to be successful journalist and commentator, and on the occasion of Haddington's 90th anniversary, the club received a letter from the Bill McLaren stating how much he owed Jock for early tutelage.

== See also ==
- Alex Angus and Charlie Usher, who also played both before and after the First World War.
- Thomas Gisborne Gordon, one-armed Irish player.
