= Colin Hill (rugby union) =

Scotland international rugby union player

- Born: Colin Cecil Pitcairn Hill; 17 July 1887 Leslie, Fife, Scotland
- Died: 9 June 1953 (aged 65) Kilbirnie, Scotland

Rugby union career
- Position: Forward
Amateur team(s)
Years	Team	Apps	(Points)
- St. Andrews University
Provincial / State sides
Years	Team	Apps	(Points)
1908-10	Midlands District		
1910	North of Scotland District		
1911	Whites Trial		
International career
Years	Team	Apps	(Points)
1912	Scotland	2	(0)

Colin Hill (17 July 1887 – 9 June 1953) was a Scotland international rugby union player. He played as a Forward.

== Rugby Union career ==
=== Amateur career ===
After being educated at Fettes College Hill went to St. Andrews University. Hill then played rugby union for St. Andrews University.

=== Provincial career ===
He played for the Midlands District in their match against North of Scotland District on 7 November 1908 and on 19 November 1910. The day on 7 November 1908 was particularly notable for Hill as he refereed a hockey match in the morning between Dundee High School and Madras College F.P. in Dundee's Recreation Grounds; before then playing rugby union for the Midlands District that afternoon.

He played for the combined North of Scotland District against the South of Scotland District on 10 December 1910.

He played for the Whites Trial side against the Blues Trial side on 21 January 1911, while still playing with St. Andrews University.

=== International career ===
Hill played in 2 tests for Scotland.

== Military career ==
In the First World War he joined the 11 battalion of the Royal Scots as a captain and fought in France. He graduated to be a Lieutenant. He was awarded the Victory Medal and the British Star. He later became an army chaplain.

== Religious career ==
Hill followed his father into the ministry, was ordained in 1920 and became a minister of the Church of Scotland. At the time of his father's death in 1922 he was an army chaplain in India. He held a post in Kilbirnie in North Ayrshire for many years. He died in the manse.

He served on the Ayrshire Education Committee for 15 years; was on the Primary promotions Board; and on the Ayrshire Educational Trust.
