= Frederick Harding Turner =

Scotland international rugby union player

Frederick Turner
- Born: Frederick Harding Turner; 29 May 1888 Liverpool, England
- Died: 10 January 1915 (aged 26) Kemmelberg, Belgium
- University: Trinity College, Oxford

Rugby union career
- Position: Flanker
Amateur team(s)
Years	Team	Apps	(Points)
- Oxford University
Provincial / State sides
Years	Team	Apps	(Points)
1911	Whites Trial		
International career
Years	Team	Apps	(Points)
1911-14	Scotland	15	(37)
- Military career
- Allegiance: United Kingdom
- Branch: British Army
- Conflicts: Battle of the Somme

Frederick Harding Turner (29 May 1888 – 10 January 1915) was a Scotland international rugby union player.

== Rugby Union career ==
=== Amateur career ===
Turner was educated at Sedbergh and Trinity College, Oxford. He played for Oxford University, and Liverpool.

=== Provincial career ===
He played for the Whites Trial side against the Blues Trial side on 21 January 1911 while still with Oxford University.

=== International career ===
He was capped 15 times for Scotland in 1911–14, becoming captain of the squad in 1914. Turner was a back-row forward, who had taken the kicks in the last match before the war: a Calcutta Cup match at Inverleith (Edinburgh), which Scotland lost 15–16. James Huggan and John George Will also played in this match. He also played first-class cricket, for the Oxford University Cricket Club.

== Military career ==
He was killed in World War I in the trenches near Kemmel on 10 January 1915 in a trench occupied by his platoon of the Liverpool Scottish when overseeing the organisation of a barbed wire entanglement.

He is buried in an isolated plot in Kemmel churchyard, not in one of the larger Commonwealth cemeteries. He was buried in the Kemmel churchyard next to Percy Dale Kendall who captained England in 1903. His grave was prepared by Dr Noel Chavasse VC and Bar, MC, who also died at Ypres in August 1917. The battlefield consumed both graves and Kendal and Turner's remains have never been found. [2]

== See also ==
- List of international rugby union players killed in action during the First World War
