= Lewis Robertson =

Scotland international rugby union player

- Born: 4 August 1883 Edinburgh, Scotland
- Died: 2 November 1914 (aged 31) Ypres salient, Belgium

Rugby union career
Amateur team(s)
Years	Team	Apps	(Points)
- Fettesian-Lorettonian
–	Edinburgh Wanderers		
–	London Scottish		
–	Army Rugby Union		
–	Monkstown		
–	United Services Portsmouth		
Provincial / State sides
Years	Team	Apps	(Points)
1910	Edinburgh District		
1911	Whites Trial		
International career
Years	Team	Apps	(Points)
1908–13	Scotland	9	
- Military career
- Burial place: Ypres Reservoir Cemetery
- Allegiance: United Kingdom
- Branch: British Army
- Service years: 1903–1914
- Rank: Captain
- Unit: 1st Bn Queen's Own Cameron Highlanders
- Conflicts: First World War: Western Front; First Battle of the Aisne; First Battle of Ypres †

Captain Lewis Robertson (4 August 1883 – 3 November 1914) was a Scottish rugby union player. He played for London Scottish FC and was capped nine times for Scotland between 1908 and 1913. He also played for the Army from 1904 to 1914, and several other clubs.

After leaving school, he attended the Royal Military College, Sandhurst and, passing out with honours, he joined the Queen's Own Cameron Highlanders in 1903. He was killed in World War I from wounds received in action at Ypres. He is buried at the Ypres Reservoir Cemetery.

== Early life ==
Lewis Robertson was born on 4 August 1883, the third son of James, a wine merchant, and Agnes Rae Robertson of Edinburgh. His siblings were Agnes, William, James, Katherine, Jessie, and Frances. He attended Cargilfield Preparatory School, and Fettes College, and then went on to RMC Sandhurst.

== Rugby Union career ==
=== Amateur career ===
Robertson played rugby for Fettesian-Lorettonian, London Scottish, Monkstown, Edinburgh Wanderers, and United Services Portsmouth. He also represented RMC Sandhurst against RMA Sandhurst in 1902, and the Army in the annual match against the Navy from 1909 to 1914. In the last year, he was captain of the Army XV but he voluntarily offered to relinquish his position because he deemed himself out of form and unworthy of it, according to an article published after his death in Windsor Magazine.

=== Provincial career ===
He played for Edinburgh District against Glasgow District in the 1910 inter-city match, while with Edinburgh Wanderers. Edinburgh District won the match 26–5.

He played for the Whites Trial side against the Blues Trial side on 21 January 1911, while with London Scottish. He scored a drop goal in a 26–19 win for the Whites.

=== International career ===
He earned nine caps for Scotland between 1908 and 1913. The first was against England in March 1908, and three years passed before he was selected a second time, for the match against Wales in February 1911. The following year, 1912, he played in every game for Scotland (except the France match), including the one against the South African side on tour of the Home Nations. He was selected for the France match but did not play due to a family bereavement. In 1913, he played in the three matches against the Home Nations, his last against England in a close-fought match at Twickenham, which the home side won by one try to nil.

==== International appearances ====
Opposition	Score	Result	Date	Venue	Ref(s)
England	16–10	Win	21 March 1908	Inverleith	
Wales	10–32	Lost	4 February 1911	Inverleith	
Wales	21–6	Lost	3 February 1912	Swansea	
Ireland	10–8	Lost	24 February 1912	Lansdowne Road	
England	8–3	Won	16 March 1912	Inverleith	
South Africa	0–16	Lost	23 November 1912	Inverleith	
Wales	0–8	Lost	1 February 1913	Inverleith	
Ireland	29–14	Won	22 February 1913	Inverleith	
England	3–0	Lost	15 March 1913	Twickenham	

== Military career ==
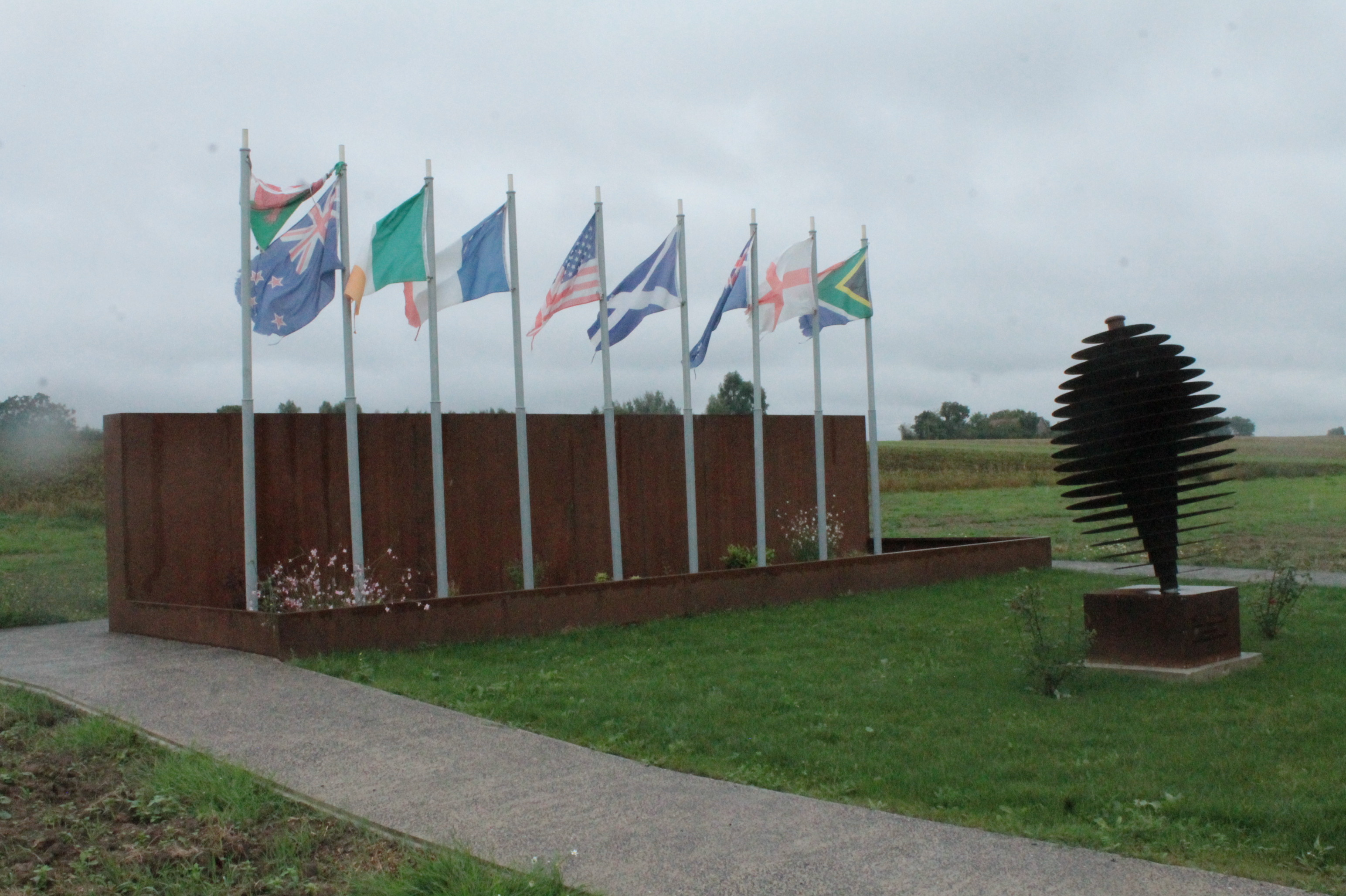
Memorial to the 133 rugby players killed in the Great War, at Fromelles

Robertson passed out of RMC Sandhurst with honours, and joined the 1st Battalion Queen's Own Cameron Highlanders as Second Lieutenant on 22 April 1903. His regiment transferred to Dublin in 1905. He was promoted to Lieutenant effective 11 March 1909. In January 1911, he was appointed an Assistant Superintendent of Gymnasia. At the outbreak of the First World War, Robertson was recalled to the depot in Inverness, and was then briefly at Aldershot before his regiment crossed to France in September 1914 to fight on the Aisne. On 2 November 1914, Robertson was in the trenches at Ypres, when he was wounded in the arm. After having the wound dressed, he returned to his company and was wounded a second time, more seriously, and he died the following day.

He is buried at the Ypres Reservoir Commonwealth War Graves Commission Cemetery (Grave II. A. 4.) and is also among the 133 names of rugby players killed in the Great War on the memorial at Fromelles in north France.

== See also ==
- List of international rugby union players killed in World War I

== Bibliography ==
- Clutterbuck, L. A.; Dooner, W. T. (1917). The Bond of Sacrifice: A Biographical Record of all British Officers who fell in the Great War. Vol. 1. Navy and Military Press. p. 196. ISBN 978-1843422259.
- McEwen, Alistair (2014). Scottish Rugby Internationals Who Fell (PDF). University of Edinburgh. Archived from the original (PDF) on 19 August 2016.
- Sewell, Edward Humphrey Dalrymple (1919). The Rugby Football Internationals Roll of Honour. London, Edinburgh: T. C. & E. C. Jack.
