= Andrew Ross (rugby union, born 1892) =

Scotland international rugby union player

- Born: Andrew Russell Ross; 13 January 1892 Edinburgh, Scotland
- Died: 21 June 1981 (aged 89) London, England

Rugby union career
- Position: Lock
Amateur team(s)
Years	Team	Apps	(Points)
- Edinburgh University
Provincial / State sides
Years	Team	Apps	(Points)
1910	Edinburgh District		
1911	Whites Trial		
International career
Years	Team	Apps	(Points)
1911-14	Scotland	4	(0)

Andrew Ross (13 January 1892 – 21 June 1981) was a Scotland international rugby union player from Edinburgh. He played at Lock.

== Rugby Union career ==
=== Amateur career ===
He played rugby union for Edinburgh University.

=== Provincial career ===
He was capped by Edinburgh District in the inter city game against Glasgow District on 3 December 1910.

He played for the Whites Trial side against Blues Trial on 21 January 1911, scoring a try in a 26–19 win for the Whites.

=== International career ===
He was capped 4 times for Scotland from 1911 to 1914.
