= Alex Angus =

Scottish cricketer & Scotland international rugby union player

- Born: Alexander William Angus; 11 November 1889 Sydney, Australia
- Died: 25 March 1947 (aged 57) Edinburgh, Scotland

Rugby union career
- Position: Centre
Amateur team(s)
Years	Team	Apps	(Points)
- Watsonians
Provincial / State sides
Years	Team	Apps	(Points)
1910	Edinburgh District		
1911	Whites Trial	1	(4)
International career
Years	Team	Apps	(Points)
1909-20	Scotland	18	(9)

Alexander William Angus (11 November 1889 – 23 March 1947) was a Scottish international rugby union and cricket player.

== Rugby Union career ==
=== Amateur career ===
He played club rugby for Watsonians.

=== Provincial career ===
He played for Edinburgh District against Glasgow District in the 1910 inter-city match. Edinburgh won the match 26–5, with Angus scoring a try.

He played for the Whites Trial side against the Blues Trial side on 21 January 1911, while still with Watsonians. He scored a drop goal in a 26–19 win for the Whites.

=== International career ===
He was capped eighteen for the Scotland rugby union team between 1909 and 1920.

Richard Bath mentions him as one of the three Scottish players "who've gone the longest without (between) scoring a try for Scotland" along with Alan Tait and Gary Armstrong. This is partly because World War I occurred in the middle of his international career, a period in which all international rugby ceased. He was first capped in 1909, scoring two tries in fourteen matches before the Great War. His next four caps came in 1920, and he scored against Ireland on 28 February 1920 – just over nine years since his previous try. Scotland won that match 19–0.

== Cricket career ==
He also played for the Scotland national cricket team.

== See also ==
- List of Scottish cricket and rugby union players
- Jock Wemyss and Charlie Usher, other players capped on both sides of the war.
