= James Milne Henderson =

Scotland international rugby union player

James Henderson
- Born: James Young Milne Henderson; 9 March 1891 Edinburgh, Scotland
- Died: 31 July 1917 (aged 26) Flanders, Belgium

Rugby union career
- Position: Fly-half
Amateur team(s)
Years	Team	Apps	(Points)
- Watsonians
Provincial / State sides
Years	Team	Apps	(Points)
1911	Blues Trial	1	(0)
International career
Years	Team	Apps	(Points)
1911	Scotland	1	(0)

Lt. James Young Milne Henderson (9 March 1891 – 31 July 1917) was a Scottish rugby union player and British Army officer who was killed in World War I.

== Rugby Union career ==
=== Amateur career ===
He was educated at George Watson's College and played for the Watsonian RFC. A diverse athlete, he also played cricket, field hockey and was a champion swimmer as well, winning the East of Scotland swimming championship.

He moved to Travancore, India for business. There he played for Madras Rugby Club.

=== Provincial career ===
He played for the Blues Trial side against the Whites Trial side on 21 January 1911, while still with Watsonians.

=== International career ===
He had one cap for Scotland against England in 1911.

== Business career ==
Milne Henderson was a works manager for the Scottish food company McVitie and Price.

== Military career ==
He served in the Highland Light Infantry and was mentioned in despatches by Field Marshal the Earl Haig. He was killed in the Third Battle of Ypres in July 1917. He is commemorated at the Menin Gate Ypres Memorial.

== Family ==
Milne Henderson was born James Young Henderson in Edinburgh to John, a chartered accountant and bank manager, and Edwardina "Ina" Young Henderson. (The family added the Milne to their surname a few years after he was born.) He had four brothers and one sister.

His younger brother 2nd Lt. John Milne Henderson of the Royal Flying Corps was killed six months later in France. Their oldest brother was Royal Navy Commodore Thomas Milne Henderson OBE (1888–1968).
