= William Campbell Church =

Scotland international rugby union player

Bill Church
- Born: William Campbell Church; 5 August 1883 Partick, Glasgow, Scotland
- Died: 28 June 1915 (aged 31) Gallipoli, Turkey

Rugby union career
- Position: Centre / Wing
Amateur team(s)
Years	Team	Apps	(Points)
- Glasgow University
1904-07	Glasgow Academicals		
Provincial / State sides
Years	Team	Apps	(Points)
- Glasgow District
International career
Years	Team	Apps	(Points)
1906	Scotland	1	(0)

Capt. William Campbell Church (5 August 1883 – 28 June 1915) was a Scottish rugby union player.

== Early life ==
Church was born in Partick, Glasgow, to William Reginald Monteith Church, a chartered accountant and stockbroker, and Christina Ainslie Church. He was educated at Glasgow Academy but left for Switzerland in 1902. He was educated at South African College.

== Rugby Union career ==
=== Amateur career ===
He moved back to Scotland to attend university, where he played for Glasgow Academicals. He played on the wing for rugby union side.

=== Provincial career ===
He was capped by Glasgow District in 1906.

=== International career ===
Church was capped for Scotland in 1906. He was also selected to play against New Zealand but he declined this.

== Military career ==
He was killed in action in World War I while serving with the Cameronians during the Gallipoli campaign. He is on the Helles Memorial for the missing at Gallipoli.
