= James Pearson (rugby union) =

Scotland international rugby union player

- Born: Alexander William Angus; 24 February 1889 Edinburgh, Scotland
- Died: 22 May 1915 (aged 26) Hooge, Belgium

Rugby union career
- Position: Centre
Amateur team(s)
Years	Team	Apps	(Points)
- Watsonians
Provincial / State sides
Years	Team	Apps	(Points)
1910	Edinburgh District		
International career
Years	Team	Apps	(Points)
1909-13	Scotland	12	(10)

James Pearson (24 February 1889 – 22 May 1915) was a Scotland international rugby union player. He played at Centre. At the First World War, Pearson joined the Royal Scots as a soldier; he was killed in Second Battle of Ypres.

== Rugby Union career ==
=== Amateur career ===
Pearson was born in Dalkeith, Midlothian. He was educated at George Watson's College, where he played cricket for the Watsonians. A friend encouraged him to take up rugby as well, and he soon excelled at that as well.

=== Provincial career ===
He played for Edinburgh District against Glasgow District in the 1910 inter-city match. Edinburgh won the match 26-5.

=== International career ===
He earned 12 caps for Scotland between 1909–13.

== Military career ==
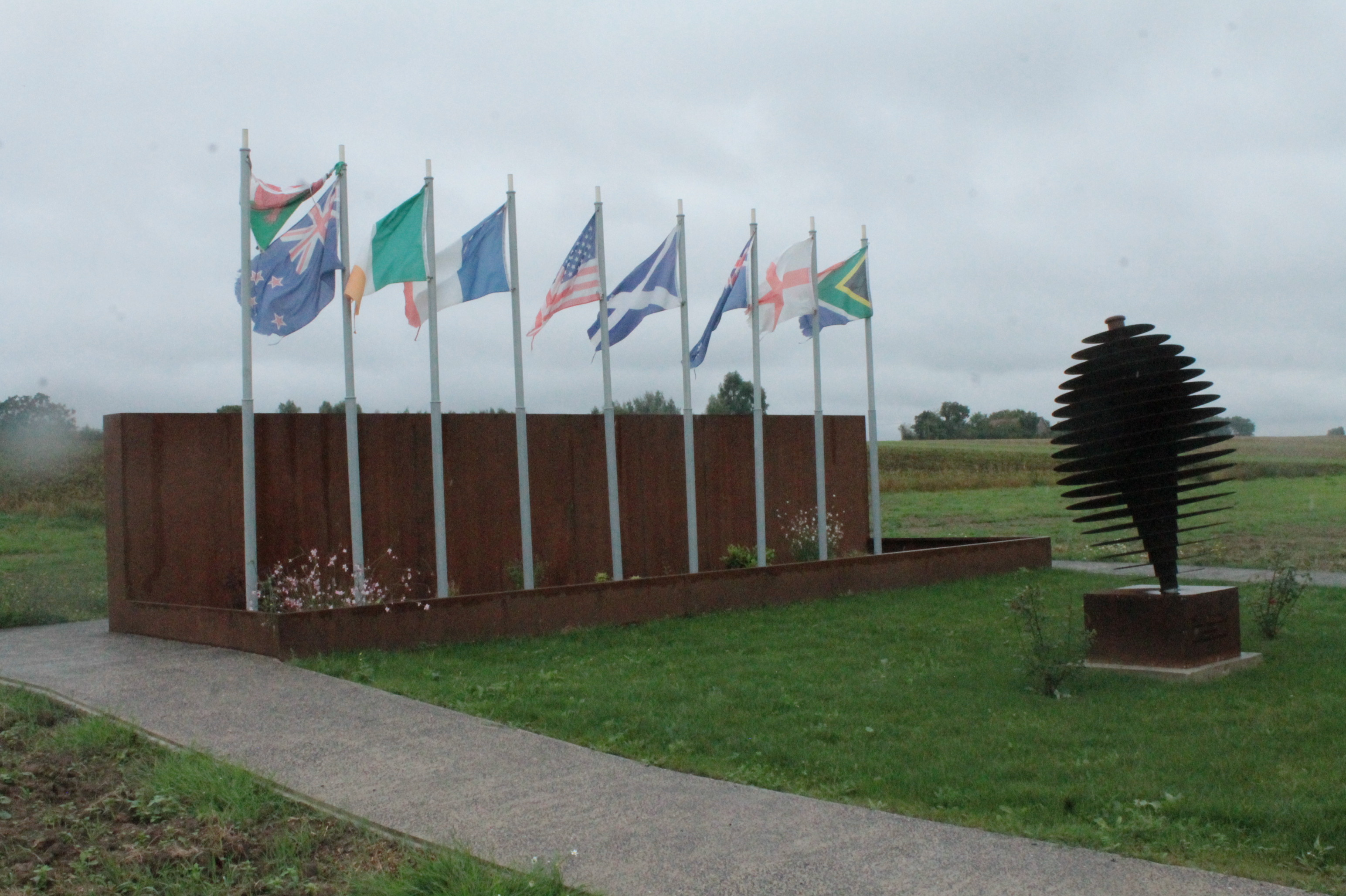
Memorial to the 133 rugby players killed in the Great War, at Fromelles

He served as a Private with the 9th Battalion, Royal Scots during the war. Following the Second Battle of Ypres, he was shot and killed by a sniper while going for water in Sanctuary Wood in May 1915.

He is buried at Sanctuary Wood Cemetery (plot VE 27) but also remembered on the special memorial to the 133 rugby players killed in the Great War, at Fromelles in north France.
