= Ronald Simson =

- Born: Ronald Francis Simson; 6 September 1890 Edinburgh, Scotland
- Died: 14 September 1914 (aged 24) Aisne, France

Rugby union career
- Position: Centre
Amateur team(s)
Years	Team	Apps	(Points)
- London Scottish
Provincial / State sides
Years	Team	Apps	(Points)
1911	Blues Trial	1	(3)
International career
Years	Team	Apps	(Points)
1911	Scotland	1	(3)

Ronald Francis Simson (6 September 1880 – 14 September 1914) was a Scottish rugby union player for Scotland. Simson was the first Scottish rugby international to die in the First World War.

== Early life ==
Ronald Simson was born in Edinburgh on 6 September 1880.

== Rugby Union career ==
=== Amateur career ===
He attended Edinburgh Academy and the Royal Military Academy, Woolwich, where he represented the Woolwich XV in a 49–9 victory over Royal Military College, Sandhurst. He also played for London Scottish, a team especially hard hit because many of them joined the London Scottish regiment.

=== Provincial career ===
He played for the Blues Trial side against the Whites Trial side on 21 January 1911, while still with London Scottish. He scored a try in the match but the Blues lost 19–26 to the Whites.

=== International career ===
Simson was selected to play for Scotland in one match, against England at Twickenham on 18 March 1911. Simson scored one try for Scotland in the game, which they lost 13–8.

== Military service ==
Simson joined the Royal Field Artillery in July 1911. Having played for the Army & Navy team, he was selected to represent Scotland against England in 1911. He was promoted in July 1914 to Lieutenant in the 116th Battery, 26th Brigade. Simson was killed in the First Battle of the Aisne, which was the Allied follow-up offensive against the right wing of the German First Army (led by Alexander von Kluck) & Second Army (led by Karl von Bülow) as they retreated after the First Battle of the Marne earlier in September 1914. A shell exploded below the horse he was riding; both he and the horse were killed. He is buried at Moulins New Communal Cemetery in Aisne France.

== See also ==
- List of international rugby union players killed in action during the First World War
