= Dave Howie =

Scotland international rugby union player

David Dickie Howie
- Born: 12 May 1888 Rosebery Temple, Midlothian, Scotland
- Died: 19 January 1916 (aged 27) Cairo, Egypt
- School: Kirkcaldy High School
- Notable relative: Bob Howie

Rugby union career
- Position: Forward
Amateur team(s)
Years	Team	Apps	(Points)
1908–14	Kirkcaldy		
Provincial / State sides
Years	Team	Apps	(Points)
1910	Midlands District		
1910	North of Scotland District		
International career
Years	Team	Apps	(Points)
1912–13	Scotland	7	(0)
- Military career
- Burial place: Cairo War Memorial Cemetery
- Allegiance: United Kingdom
- Branch: British Army
- Service years: 1914–1916
- Rank: Second Lieutenant
- Unit: Royal Field Artillery
- Memorials: Kinghorn War Memorial

David Dickie Howie (12 May 1888 – 19 January 1916) was a rugby union player, who represented Scotland and Kirkcaldy RFC. He enlisted as a trooper in the local yeomanry in September 1914, at the start of the First World War. After undergoing training in England, he was commissioned second lieutenant in the Royal Field Artillery in April 1915 and despatched to Gallipoli in August. During the evacuation of Anzac Bay, he contracted pneumonia, and died in Cairo, Egypt, after shooting himself with a revolver while in a state of delirium. He is buried at the Cairo War Memorial Cemetery.

Howie, who played as a forward, was capped seven times for Scotland between 1912 and 1913.

== Early life and family ==
David Dickie Howie was born in Rosebery Temple, Midlothian, to Archibald and Jessie Howie. He attended Kirkcaldy High School. While there, he played as a forward in the school rugby XV for three years. He also was the winner in 1903 of the Nairn Cup, awarded to the school's champion athlete.

Howie, like his father, was a farmer. He married Marie Winifred Gibson, with whom he had a daughter, Eleanor Margot Linton Dickie, born 4 May 1915 in Skegness.

Dave Howie was the brother of Bob Howie, who also played for Kirkcaldy and also gained seven national caps, in the 1920s, as well as representing Great Britain in four games on the 1924 tour to South Africa. Although he and his brother gained fourteen caps between them, their father, a grim farmer, never watched them once, saying: "Rugby an' fermin' will no agree, an' A ken which'll pit mair money in yer pooch."

== Rugby Union career ==
=== Amateur career ===
Howie began playing for Kirkcaldy in 1908. He was considered a "useful forward", and in 1912 became the first Kirkcaldy player to earn selection for Scotland.

=== Provincial career ===
He played for the Midlands District in their match against North of Scotland District on 19 November 1910.

He played for the combined North of Scotland District against the South of Scotland District on 10 December 1910.

=== International career ===
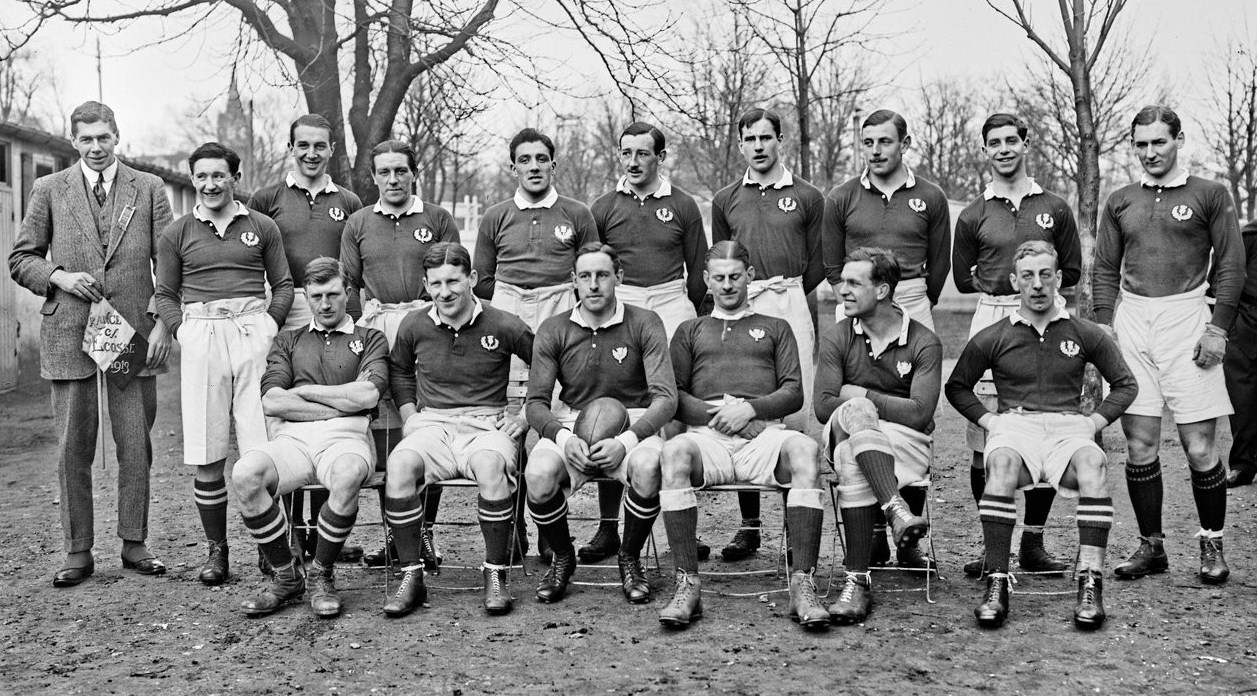
Scotland XV v France, 1 January 1913, Parc des Princes

His debut came in Scotland's first international match of 1912, with a convincing win against France. He went on to play in each of the subsequent Home Nations Championship games that year, as well as participating in the game against the South African tourists in November. He was again selected in 1913 for the games against Wales and France.

==== International appearances ====
Opposition	Score	Result	Date	Venue	Ref(s)
France	31–3	Won	20 Jan 1912	Inverleith	
Wales	21–6	Lost	3 Feb 1912	Swansea	
Ireland	10–8	Lost	24 Feb 1912	Lansdowne Road	
England	8–3	Won	16 Mar 1912	Inverleith	
South Africa	0–16	Lost	23 Nov 1912	Inverleith	
France	3–21	Won	1 Jan 1913	Parc des Princes	
Wales	0–8	Lost	1 Feb 1913	Inverleith	

== Military career and death ==
On 8 September 1914, Howie enlisted as a trooper in the Fife and Forfar Yeomanry. He remained in training in England until April 1915, when he was commissioned into the 1st Highland Brigade, Royal Field Artillery, and sailed for Gallipoli in August 1915. During the evacuation of Anzac, he contracted pneumonia and died in Cairo on 19 January 1916. His death was from 'self-inflicted revolver wounds, whilst temporarily of unsound mind, due to the delirium of pneumonia'. According to Sister Laycock, who was tending to him, he was "quiet and drowsy" during most of the day, and shot himself a few minutes after she had last seen him alive, apparently sleeping: she heard the shot on entering the room again.

He is buried at the Cairo War Memorial Cemetery, Grave No. 267 D and is commemorated on the Kinghorn War Memorial.

== See also ==
- List of international rugby union players killed in action during the First World War
