= Roland Gordon =

Scotland international rugby union player

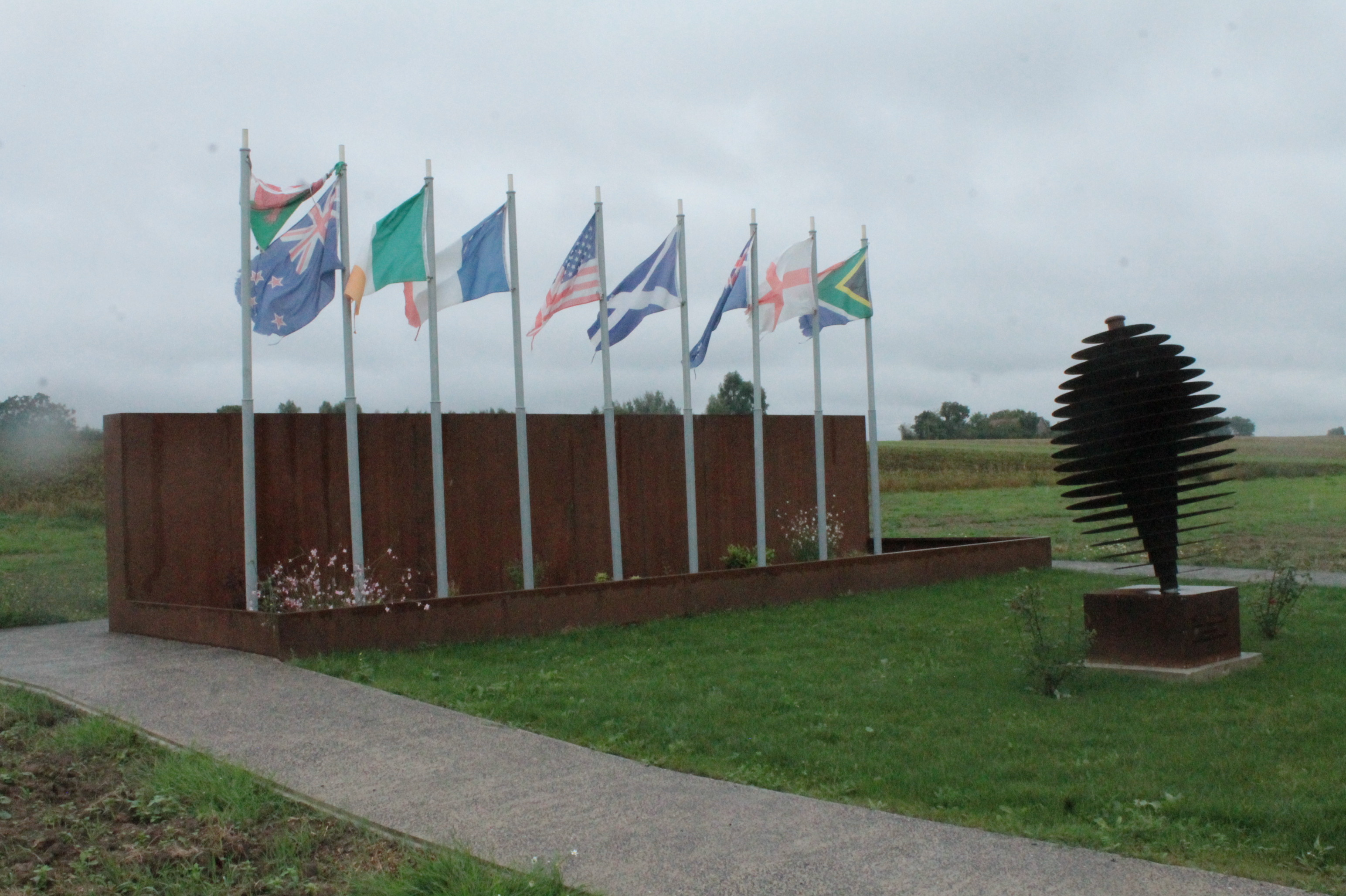
Memorial to the 133 rugby players killed in the Great War, at Fromelles

Maj. Roland Elphinstone Gordon MC (22 January 1883 – 30 August 1918) was a Scottish rugby union player and British Army officer who was killed in World War I.

Gordon was the son of civil servant George Dalrymple Gordon and Georgina Meredith Williams Gordon, of "Alwyns," Teignmouth, Devon. He was born in Selangor, Straits Settlements, Malaya, where his father worked in the colonial government's irrigation department.

He was educated at The King's School, Canterbury. In 1911, he entered the Royal Military Academy, Woolwich where he was captain of the rugby XV. In January 1913, he was commissioned as a second lieutenant in the Royal Artillery. He played for Royal Artillery RFC and was capped for Scotland against France, Wales and Ireland in 1913.

His rugby career was interrupted in 1913, when he was posted to India. After the war began, he was sent to Mesopotamia, where he was seriously wounded. During his recovery at Exeter, he coached the Royal Artillery cadets. He also played for the Cadet XV in 1916–17, playing against the Army Service Corps XV before returning to the front in 1917.

He was wounded again in 1917 and for a third time in May 1918. He was awarded the Military Cross in the 1918 Birthday Honours. He was killed in the Second Battle of the Somme in the final days of the war in 1918. He is buried in the Daours Communal Cemetery Extension in Daours. His name is listed as one of the 133 rugby players killed in the Great War on the memorial at Fromelles in north France.
