= William Ramsay Hutchison =

Scotland international rugby union player

William Hutchison
- Born: William Ramsay Hutchison; 16 January 1889 Glasgow, Scotland
- Died: 22 March 1918 (aged 29) Arras, France

Rugby union career
- Position: Lock
Amateur team(s)
Years	Team	Apps	(Points)
- Glasgow HSFP
Provincial / State sides
Years	Team	Apps	(Points)
- Glasgow District
International career
Years	Team	Apps	(Points)
1911	Scotland	1	(0)

Capt. William Ramsay Hutchison (16 January 1889 – 22 March 1918) was a Scottish international rugby union player. He was killed in World War I.

He was born in Hillhead, Glasgow the son of John Hutchison MA LLD and his wife, Margaret Paterson McCall and was educated at Glasgow Academy.

He played for Glasgow District in the inter-city match against Edinburgh District on 3 March 1910.

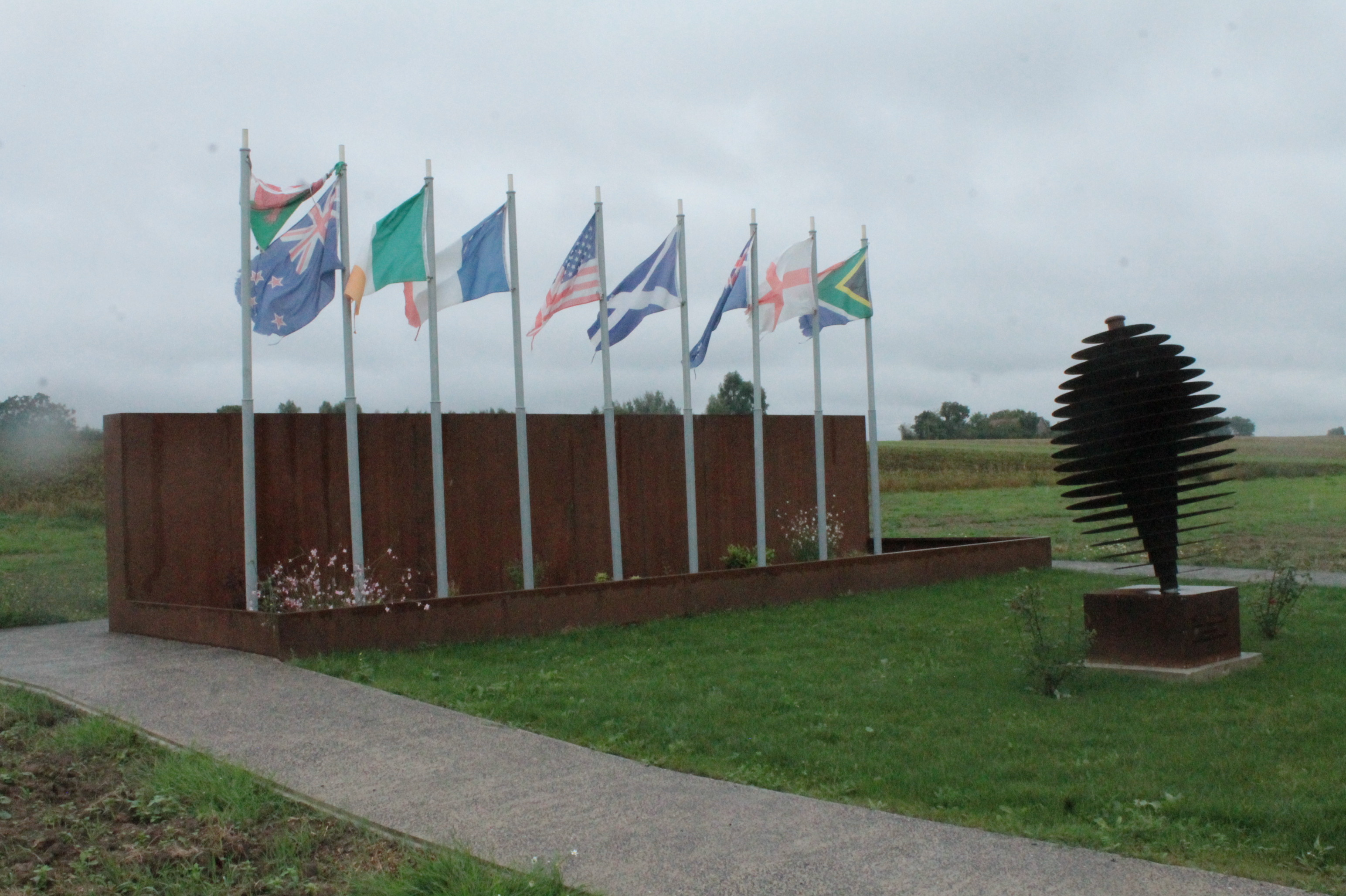
Memorial to the 133 rugby players killed in the Great War, at Fromelles

He played for Glasgow High School FP and was capped for Scotland in 1911.

He was commissioned as an officer in the Royal Scots Fusiliers in 1912 and promoted to Captain in 1913. He was sent to France at the beginning of the First World War seeing action at the Battle of Loos and on the Somme at Delville Wood and other conflicts. In 1917 he fought at the Battle of the Scarpe, Pilckem and Langemark before being killed in the Battle of Saint-Quentin on 22 March 1918. His body was not found.

He is remembered on the Arras memorial bay 5 and on the memorial to the 133 rugby players killed in the Great War at Fromelles in north France.
