= Walter Sutherland (rugby union) =

Scotland international rugby union player

- Born: Walter Riddell Sutherland; 19 November 1890 Hawick, Scotland
- Died: 4 October 1918 (aged 27) Hulluch, France

Rugby union career
- Position: Wing
Amateur team(s)
Years	Team	Apps	(Points)
- Hawick
Provincial / State sides
Years	Team	Apps	(Points)
1910	South of Scotland		
International career
Years	Team	Apps	(Points)
1910-14	Scotland	13	(12)

Walter Riddell Sutherland (19 October 1890 – 4 October 1918), also known as Wattie Suddie, was a Scotland international rugby union player.

== Early life ==
Sutherland was the son of Alexander and Isabella Sutherland of the Imperial Hotel in Hawick, Roxburghshire. He was educated at Teviot Grove Academy before training to be a sanitary inspector in Hawick. He also played cricket and football and was a champion runner, winning the Scottish Borders title at multiple distances.

== Rugby Union career ==
=== Amateur career ===
He played for Hawick RFC.

=== Provincial career ===
Sutherland played for the South of Scotland in 1910.

=== International career ===
He gained 13 caps playing for the Scotland national rugby union team between 1910 and 1914 and was regarded as the best Scottish wing threequarter of his day.

== Military career ==
The outbreak of the First World War put end to his rugby career, and he served with the Lothians and Border Horse, later the Argyll and Sutherland Highlanders and finally the Seaforth Highlanders. Second Lieutenant Sutherland was killed in France on 4 October 1918, aged 27, just five weeks before the armistice. He is buried at the Houchin British Cemetery in Pas-de-Calais.
