= Patrick Blair (rugby union) =

Scotland international rugby union player (1891–1915)

Patrick Charles Bentley Blair (18 July 1891 – 6 July 1915) was a Scottish rugby union player.

== Biography ==
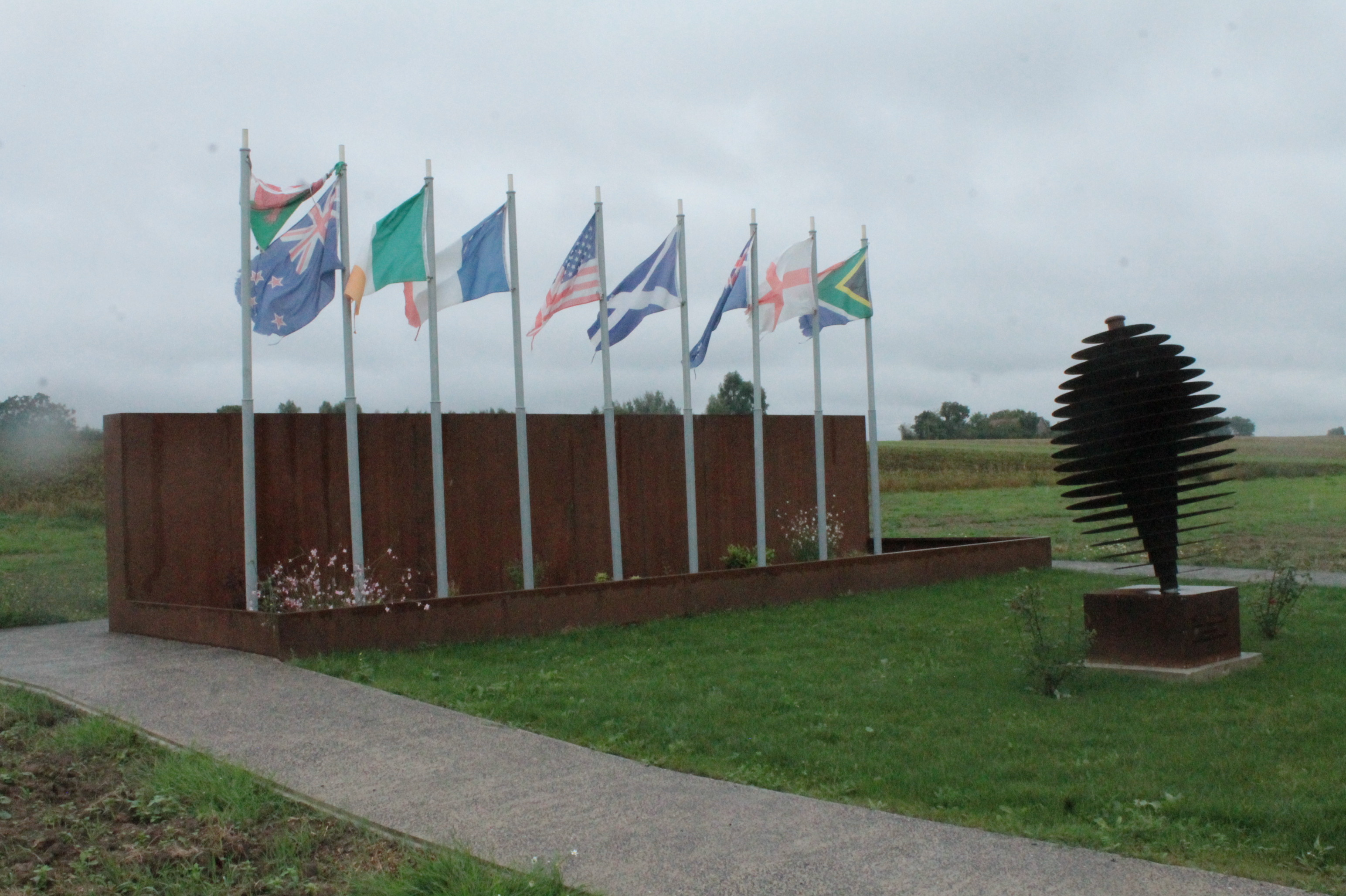
Memorial to the 133 rugby players killed in the Great War, at Fromelles

Blair was born in Wanlockhead, Dumfriesshire, the son of Rev. Charles Patrick Blair and Jeanie Bogle Smith Blair. He was educated at Fettes College in Edinburgh, where he played rugby and field hockey, and King's College, Cambridge. where he played for the King's College team and Cambridge University RFC.

Blair was capped five times for Scotland in 1912–13, against South Africa, Wales, Ireland, England and France.

After earning a first-class degree at Cambridge, Blair joined the Egyptian Civil Service's Finance Department. After World War I began, he returned to Cambridge for military training. He was commissioned into the Rifle Brigade in March 1915. Four months later, he was killed by a shell in Boezinge, Flanders. He is buried in the Talana Farm Cemetery.

Patrick is listed among the memorial to the 133 rugby players lost in the Great War at Fromelles in the north of France.
