= James Huggan =

- Born: James Laidlaw Huggan; 11 October 1888 Jedburgh, Scotland
- Died: 16 September 1914 (aged 25) Aisne. France

Rugby union career
- Position: Wing
Amateur team(s)
Years	Team	Apps	(Points)
- Jed-Forest
–	Edinburgh University		
–	London Scottish		
Provincial / State sides
Years	Team	Apps	(Points)
1910	South of Scotland		
International career
Years	Team	Apps	(Points)
1914	Scotland	1	(9)

James Laidlaw Huggan (11 October 1888 – 16 September 1914) was a Scotland rugby union player. He was killed in World War I at the First Battle of the Aisne.

== Early life ==
James Huggan was born in Jedburgh on 11 October 1888. He was educated at Darlington Grammar School before reading medicine at the University of Edinburgh.

== Rugby Union career ==
=== Amateur career ===
Huggan played for Jed-Forest. On moving to Edinburgh University to study he then played for Edinburgh University.

He then moved to play for London Scottish.

=== Provincial career ===
He played for the South of Scotland in 1910.

=== International career ===
He had taken part in the last rugby international before the war, the Calcutta Cup match at Inverleith (Edinburgh) in March 1914, scoring three tries in the game.

== Military career ==
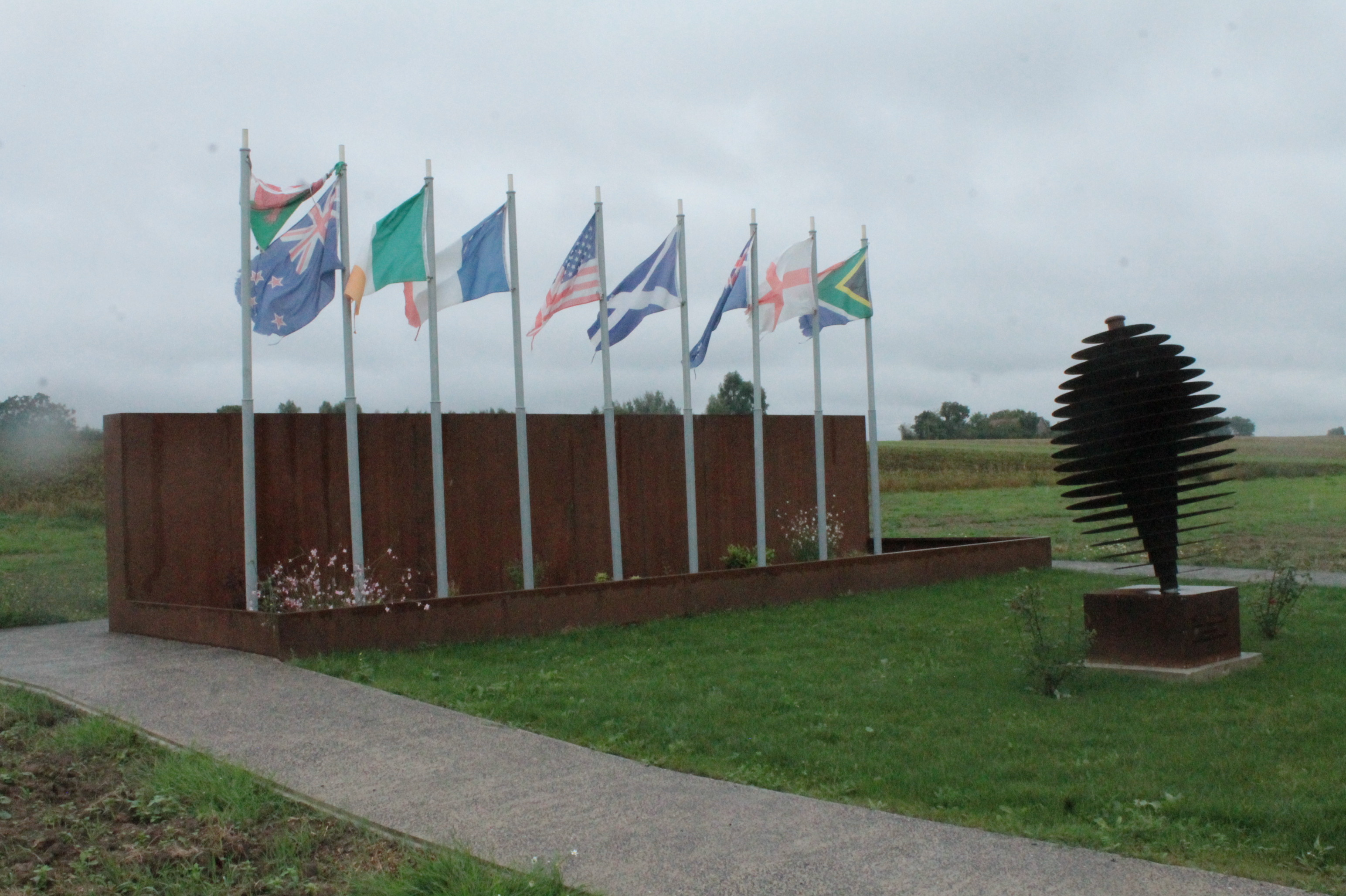
Memorial to the 133 rugby players killed in the Great War, at Fromelles

Huggan was a lieutenant of the Royal Army Medical Corps, attached to the 3rd Battalion Coldstream Guards. He is commemorated at La Ferté-sous-Jouarre memorial. He died two days after Ronald Simson, another Scottish player, who was the first rugby international to die in the conflict, and who was also at the Aisne.

Huggan is among the 133 names of rugby players killed in the Great War on the memorial at Fromelles in north France.
