= Eric Templeton Young =

Scottish rugby union player

- Born: Eric Templeton Young; 14 May 1892 Scotland
- Died: 28 June 1915 (aged 23)
- School: Cargilfield Preparatory School; Fettes College
- University: Magdalen College, Oxford

Rugby union career
Amateur team(s)
| Years | Team | Apps | (Points) |
- Oxford University RFC
| – | Glasgow Academicals RFC | | |
International career
| Years | Team | Apps | (Points) |
| 1914 | Scotland | 1 | |

Capt. Eric Templeton Young (14 May 1892 – 28 June 1915) was a Scottish rugby union player and British Army officer who was killed in the Gallipoli campaign in World War I.

Young was educated in Edinburgh at Cargilfield Preparatory School and Fettes College. He attended Magdalen College, Oxford, where he played for the university. He also played for Glasgow Academy and the Glasgow Academicals. He had one cap for Scotland against England in March 1914, the final international game on British soil before the war began.

Young joined the Territorial Army in 1911. He was promoted to captain when the war began and sent to Turkey with the 8th Battalion of The Cameronians. Two weeks after he arrived in Gallipoli, he was killed in the first day of the Battle of Gully Ravine. He is commemorated on the Helles Memorial.
