= List of Old Dunelmians =

This is a list of notable Old Dunelmians, former students of Durham School at Durham, England.

== A to E ==
- Sir Carl Douglas Aarvold (1907–1991), Recorder of London, England International rugby player, British and Irish Lions rugby player.
- Garath Archer, England International rugby player.
- Adil Arif, Emirati cricketer
- Alexander Armstrong, actor and comedian.
- Charles Adamson, Barbarians and British Lions rugby footballer. Killed in action! Brother-in-law to Lewis Vaughan Lodge.
- John Askew (1908–1942), cricketer and England rugby union international.
- Jamie Atkinson, International Show Jumper.
- Sir Ernest Nathaniel Bennett (1868–1947), politician and journalist.
- Lee Best (1978-) England rugby player.
- Sir Anthony Alfred Bowlby KCMG CB KCVO KCB (1855–1929), Surgeon-General, Mentioned in despatches five times, Distinguished Service Medal (US).
- Ralph Bradley (1717–1788) pioneer of English conveyancing law.
- William Browne, Author and President of College of Physicians
- William Laurence Burn (1904–1966), historian and lawyer.
- Edmund Carter (1845–1923), Oxford University, Victoria, and Yorkshire, first class cricketer and rower.
- Hall Charlton (1979–), Newcastle Falcons RFC.
- Rod Clements (1947–), Musician, guitarist. Founder of folk-rock band Lindisfarne
- Thomas Cooke (1722–1783), 18th-century eccentric divine, author and playwright; published two comedies, 1722–83, and also sermons.
- Sir William Fothergill Cooke (1806–79), co-inventor of the Cooke-Wheatstone electrical telegraph, founder of the world's first public telegraph company.
- Bishop Mandell Creighton (1843–1901), Bishop of London. Historian. Author.

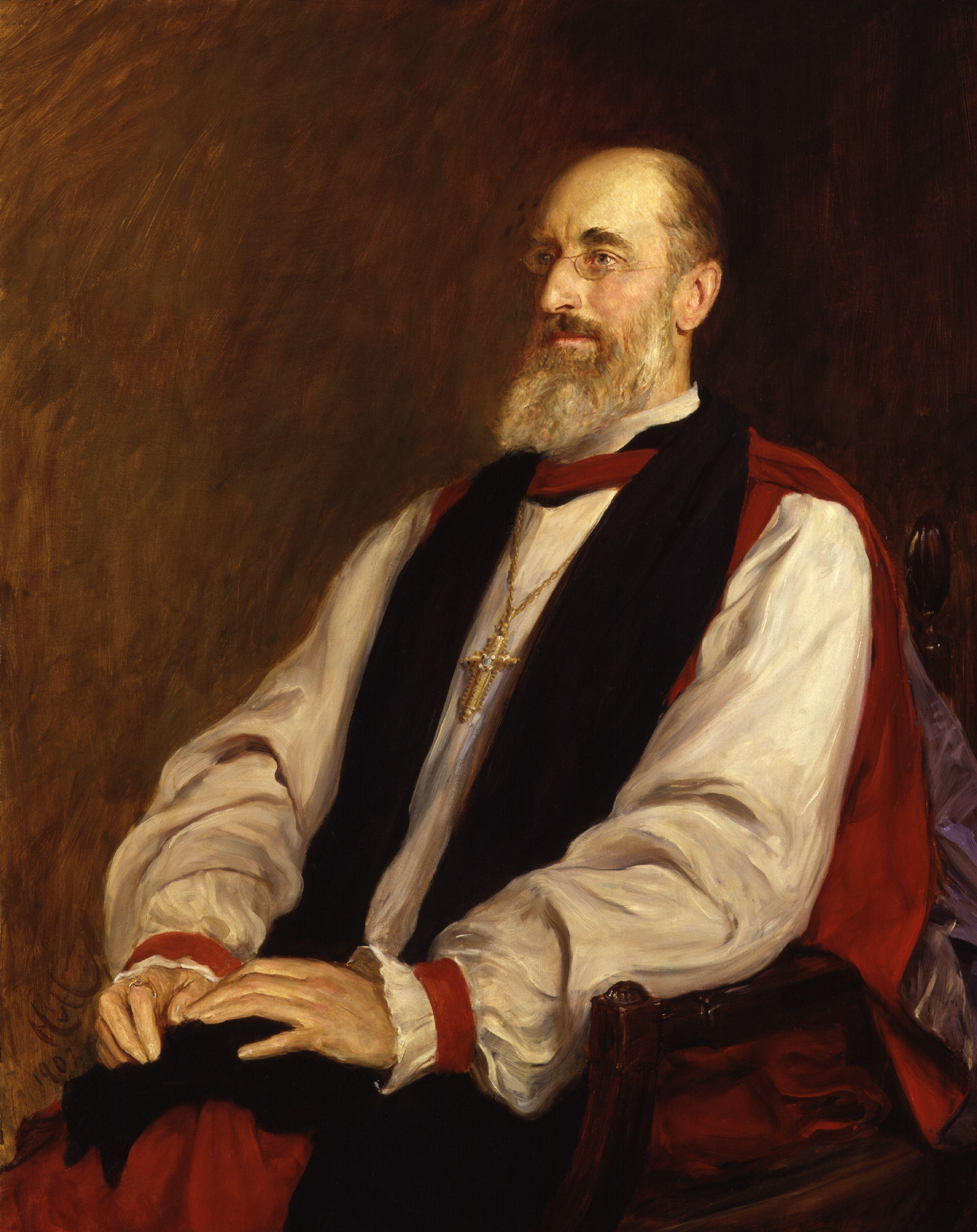
Mandell Creighton

- Barry Cumberlege (1891–1970), cricketer and England rugby footballer.
- Dominic Cummings (1971–) British political advisor and strategist
- John Robert Davison MP, QC (1826 – 15 April 1871), barrister and Liberal politician
- Christopher Beckett Denison (9 May 1825 – 30 October 1884), politician, director of GNR, Siege of Lucknow
- William Eden (1744–1814), first Baron Auckland, penal reformer and diplomatist.

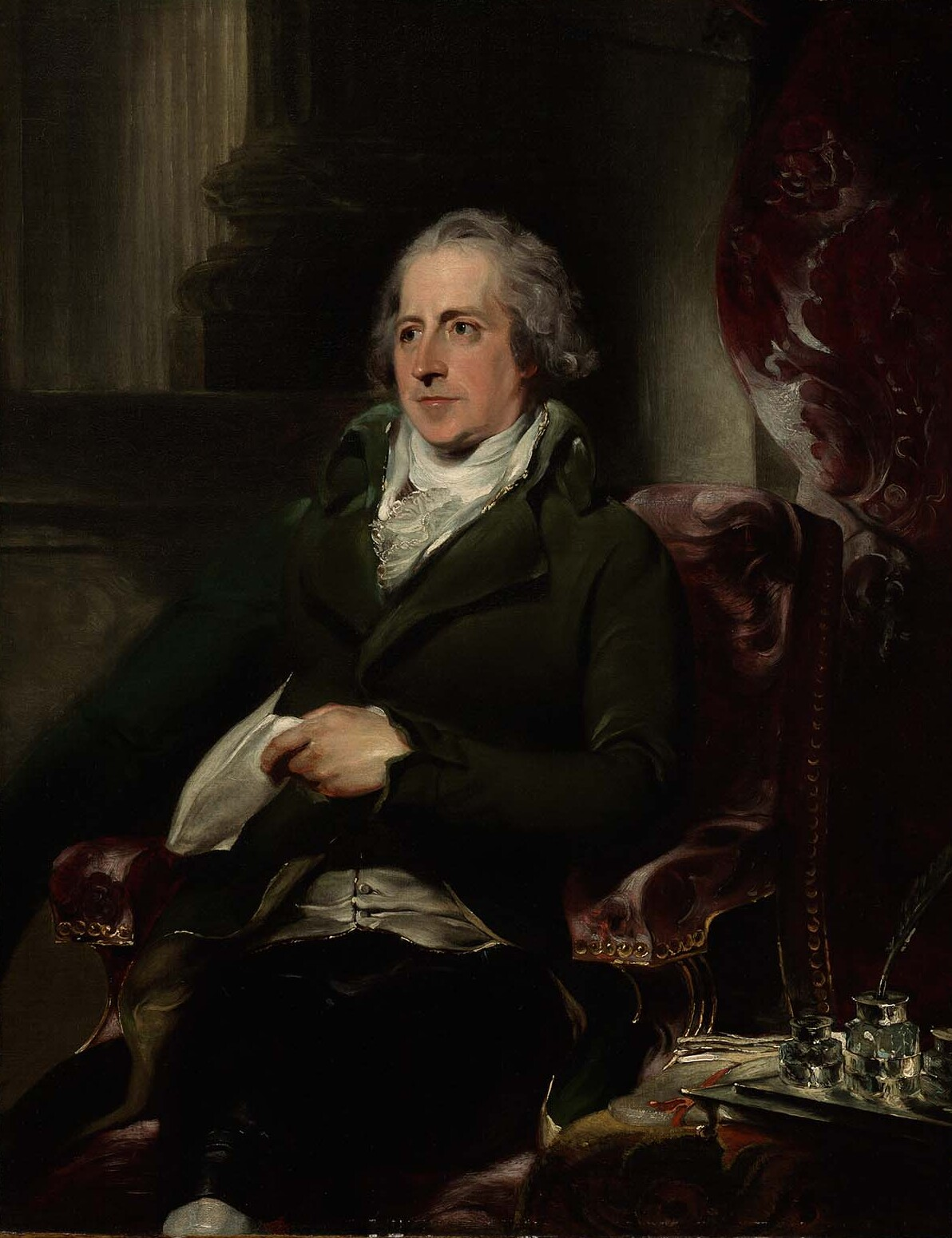
William Eden, 1st Baron Auckland

- Thomas Renton Elliott (1877–1961), physician and physiologist.

== F to J ==
- Henry Cecil Ferens (c. 1899–1975), Cricketer, gave his name to Ferens House, until 2003 a house for junior boys.
- WMW Fowler, bomber pilot and POW, culinary author.
- Henry Watson Fox (1817–1848), famous missionary in Masulipatam. Pupil and friend of Dr.Thomas Arnold at Rugby School. Author of Chapters on Missions in South India.
- Sir William Fox (1812–1893), KCMG, three times Prime Minister of New Zealand. Statesman and social reformer.

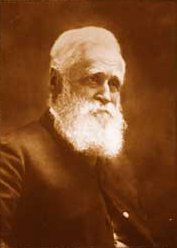
William Fox

- Edward Pritchard Gee, discovered Gee's golden langur
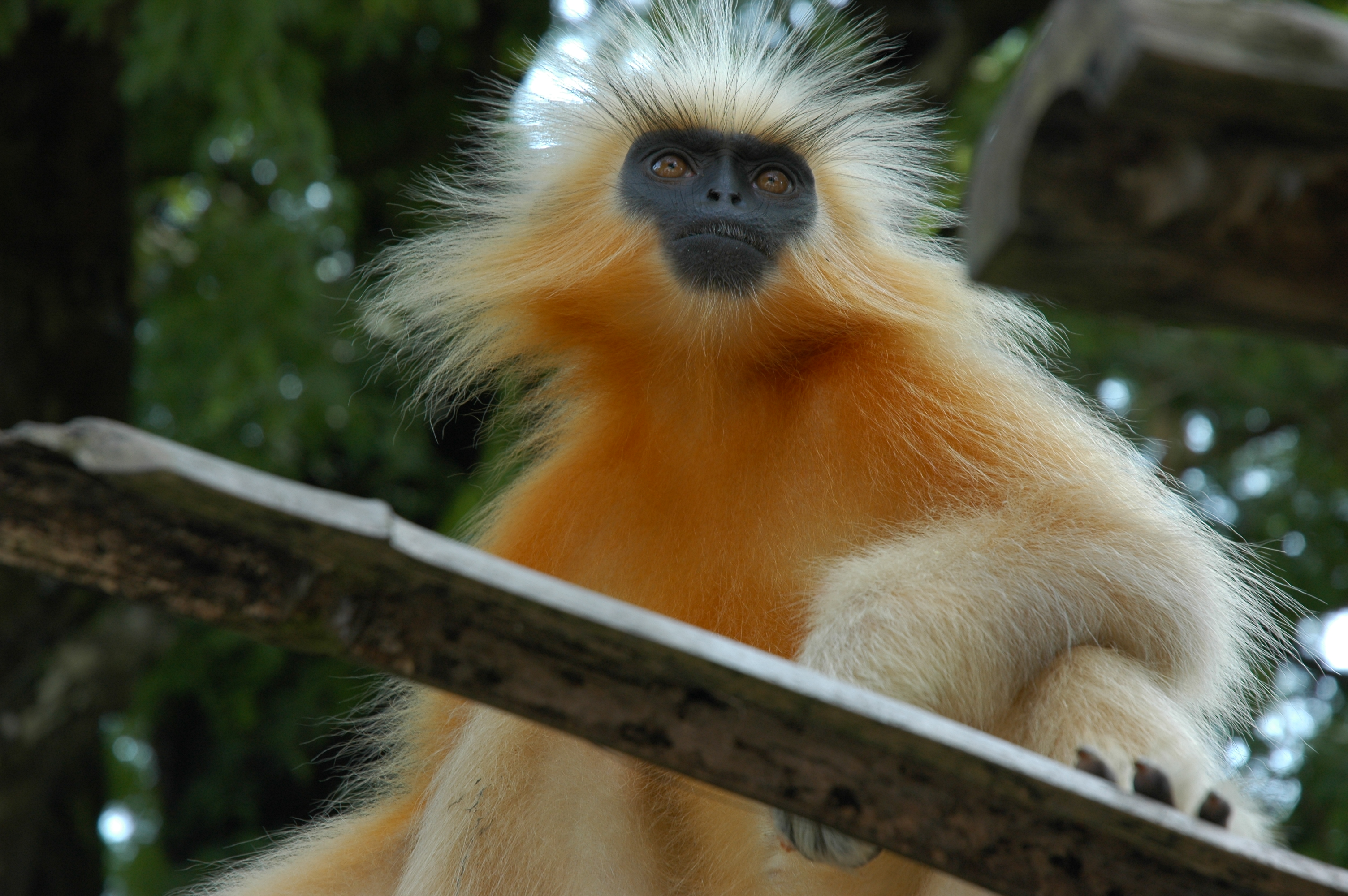
  Gee's golden langur
  , influential in creation of Chitwan National Park.
- Michael Gough (23 November 1916 – 17 March 2011), actor.
- Bishop John Graham (1794–1865), Bishop of Chester. Clerk of the closet to Queen Victoria. Taught classics and mathematics as a fellow of Christ's College, Cambridge. Vice-chancellor of Cambridge University. Chaplain to Prince Albert.
- William Greenwell (1820–1918), archaeologist and librarian.
- William Hardcastle (1918–1975), journalist and radio broadcaster, co-founder of 'The World at One' radio programme.
- Field Marshal Henry Hardinge, 1st Viscount Hardinge (1785–1856), succeeded The Duke of Wellington as Commander in Chief of the British Army, Governor-general of India, First Anglo-Sikh War.

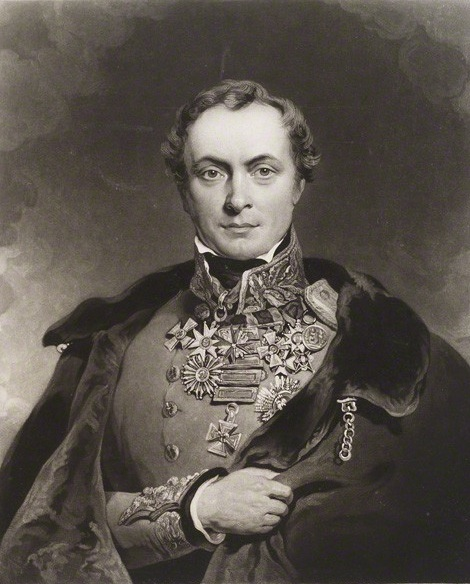
Henry Hardinge, 1st Viscount Hardinge

- Arthur Harrison (1868–1936), organ builder of note, those at Durham Cathedral, Ely Cathedral and Westminster Abbey to name a few. Partner in Harrison & Harrison.

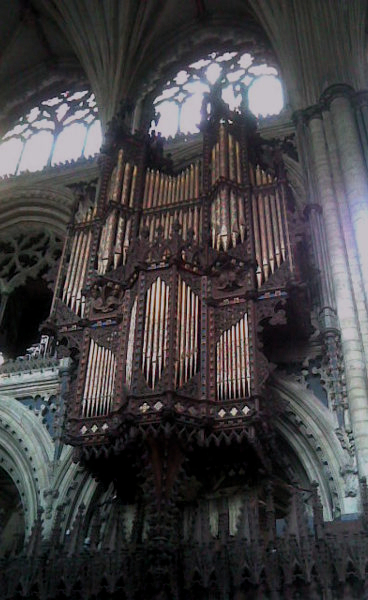
The pipes of Ely Cathedral organ by Arthur Harrison

- Ian Hay MC (1876–1952), not an OD but a master at Durham School, humorist and author.
- William Noel Hodgson MC (1893–1916), war poet on the Somme, mentioned in despatches. Killed in action.

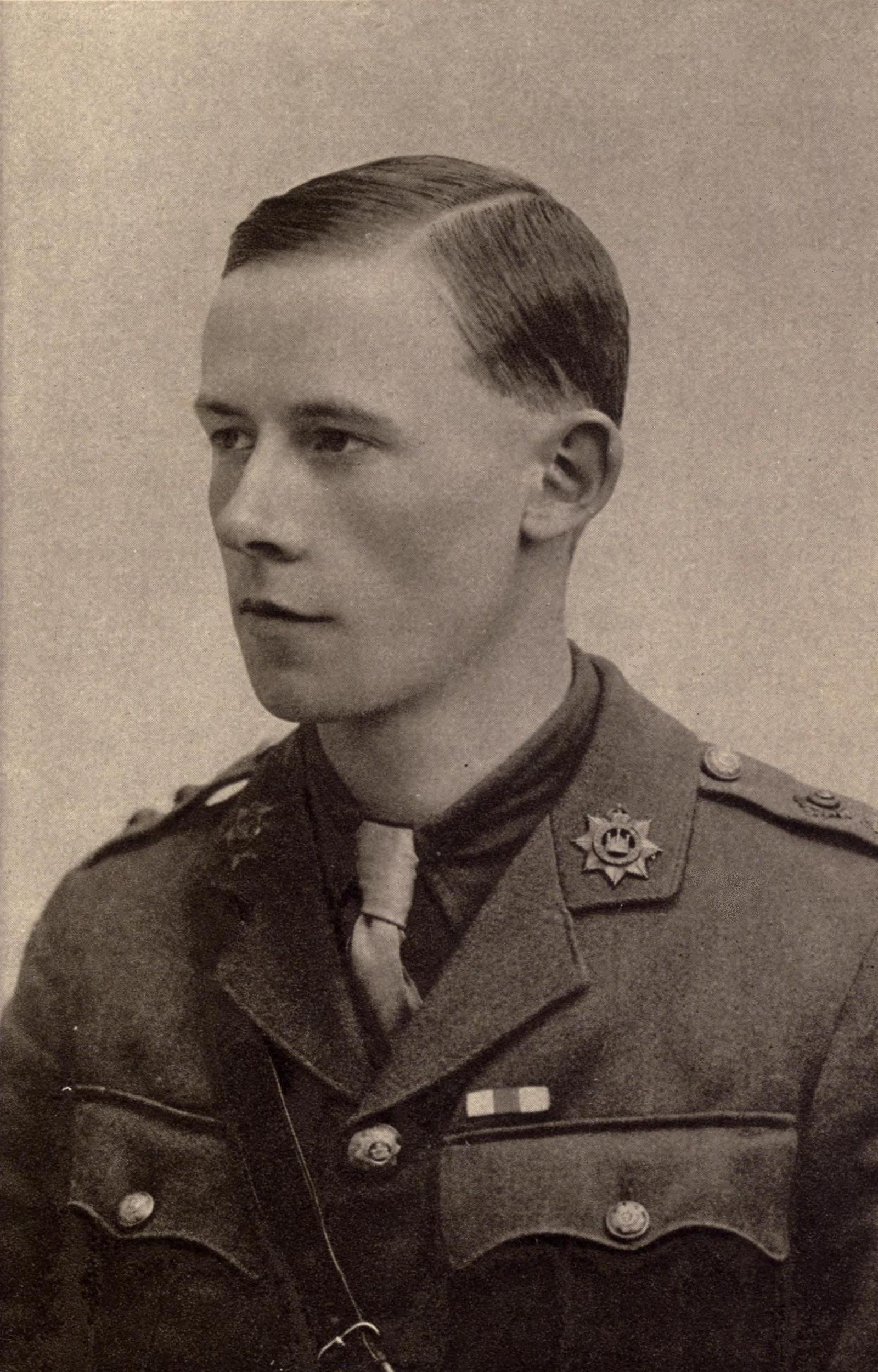
William Noel Hodgson

- Ian Hogg (1937– ), actor.
- Thomas Jefferson Hogg (1792–1862), biographer and friend of Percy Bysshe Shelley and Mary Shelley.
- Noel Forbes Humphreys, MC (1890–1918), England and British Lions rugby footballer. Killed in action.
- James Isaacson (1980–), Newcastle Falcons RFC, Leeds RFC.
- Sir Henry Evan Murchison James (1846–), author, director general of Post Office of India (1886). Author: The Long White Mountain; or Travels in Manchuria, 1889.

== K to O ==
- Graham Kerr, Scotland international rugby union player
- John Kingston, Head Coach and Director of Rugby of Harlequins R.F.C.
- Sir John Grant McKenzie Laws (1945–2020), Lord Justice of Appeal.
- Sir Donald Limon, Clerk of the House of Commons
- Lewis Vaughan Lodge, (21 December 1872 – 21 October 1916) represented the England national football team. He also played first-class cricket with Hampshire.
- Frederick Lohden OBE, England and Barbarians rugby footballer
- Sir Henry Frederick Manisty (1808–1890), judge
- James Mickleton (1638–1693), antiquary and lawyer.
- Gordon Muchall, Durham, county cricketer.
- Sir Roderick Impey Murchison (1792–1871), scientist and geologist who served in the Peninsular War.

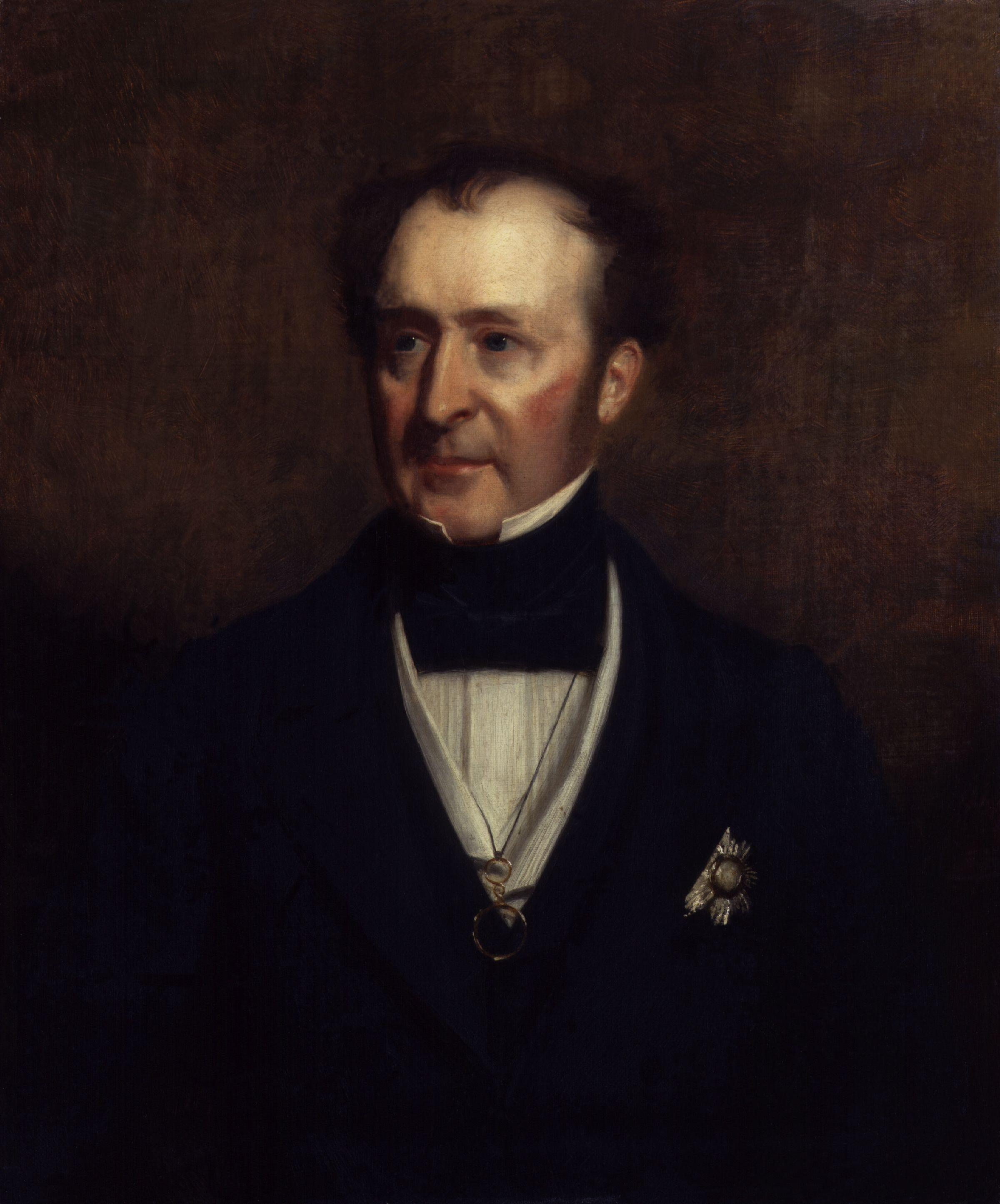
Sir Roderick Impey Murchison

- William Andrews Nesfield (1793–1881), landscape architect and artist.
- Henry Nettleship (1839–1893), influential classical scholar.

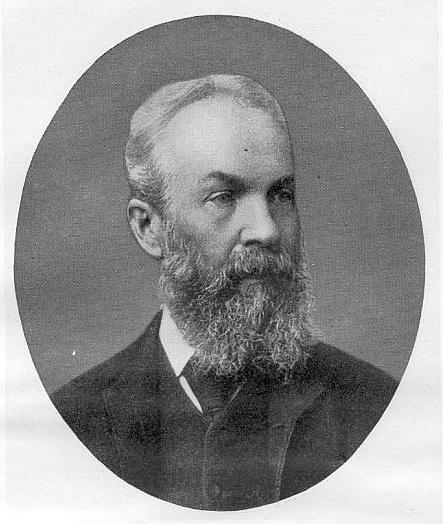
Henry Nettleship

- Sir Robert Owen (1944– ), High Court Judge.

== P to T ==
- Geoff Parling, Leicester Tigers RFC, England, British and Irish Lions (Tour of Australia 2013).
- Richard Godfrey Parsons (1882–1948), Bishop of Middleton, Bishop of Southwark, Bishop of Hereford.
- Sir Thomas Sabine Pasley, KCB, Admiral in Royal Navy
- Sir Geoffrey Pattie (1936– ), politician
- Robyn Place (1996- ), Knaresborough Players leading lady panto 2025 and all around good egg.
- Sir Robert Ker Porter (1777–1842). Painter and travel author.
- Max Pugh (1977– ) British film and television director.
- John Ranson England Rugby Union International
- Dean Edward Bannerman Ramsay (1793–1872), Author Reminiscences of Scottish Life and Character. Chief founder of the Scottish Episcopalian Church Society in 1838.Vice-president Royal Society of Edinburgh.

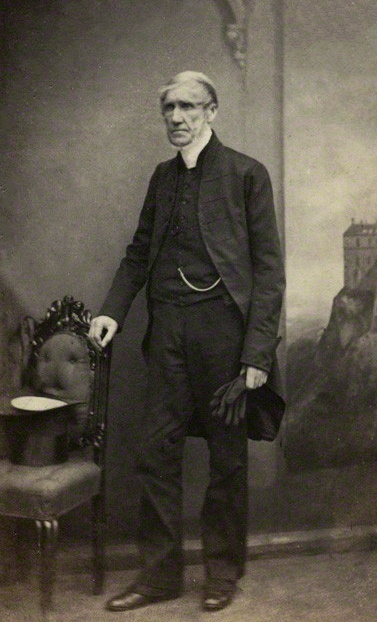
Edward Bannerman Ramsay

- Dr.James Raine (1791–1858). Not an Old Dunelmian, but second master at Durham School. Antiquarian, historian, topographer. Principle judge of the consistory court.
- James Raine (1830–1896). Antiquarian, archeologist, historian.
- John D. Rayner (1924–2005), Rabbi Emeritus of the Liberal Jewish Synagogue.
- Mike Roseberry, Middlesex and Durham, county cricketer.
- Thomas Rudd (1667/8–1733), master of Durham School, important historian and librarian of Durham cathedral and city, rector.
- John Warburton Sagar (1878–1941), England rugby player in 1901 season. Governor of Kordovan and Wadi Halfa in Sudan.
- Anthony Salvin (1799–1881), 19th-century architect who restored or extended Windsor Castle, Alnwick Castle, Warwick Castle, Rockingham Castle and the Tower of London.

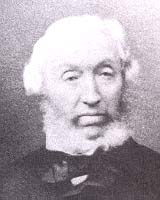
Anthony Salvin

- Herbert Gustave Schmalz (1856–1935), artist, known as Herbert Carmichael from October 1918.
- Prideaux John Selby (1788–1867). Botanist, ornithologist, illustrator.
- Granville Sharp (1735–1813), 18th-century initiator of the movement for the abolition of slavery and founder of Sierra Leone as a land for returned slaves, originator of Sharp's rule, still used as Biblical proof of Christ's divinity.

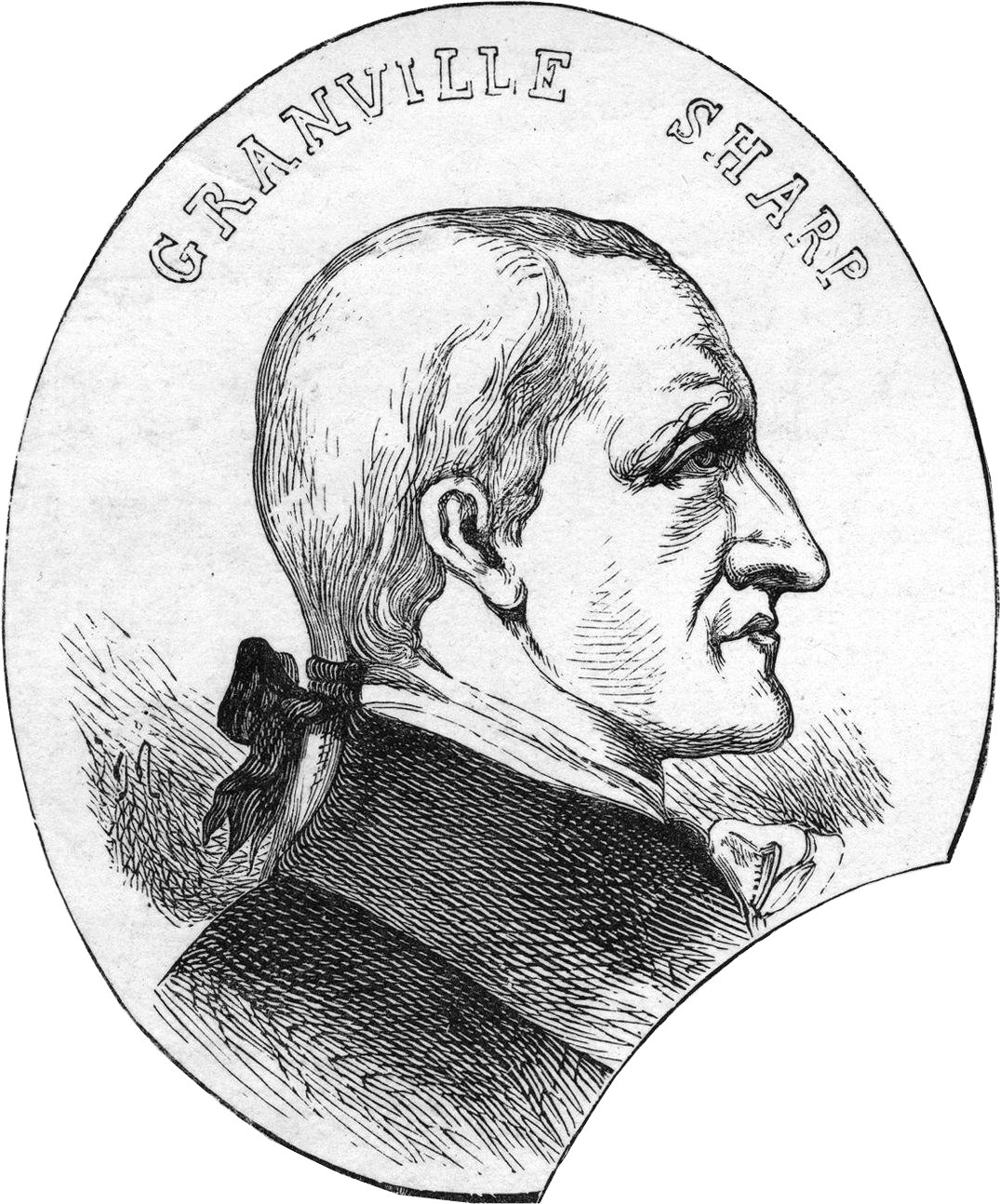
Granville Sharp

- Edward Shortt MP (1862–1935), Chief Secretary for Ireland and Home Secretary.

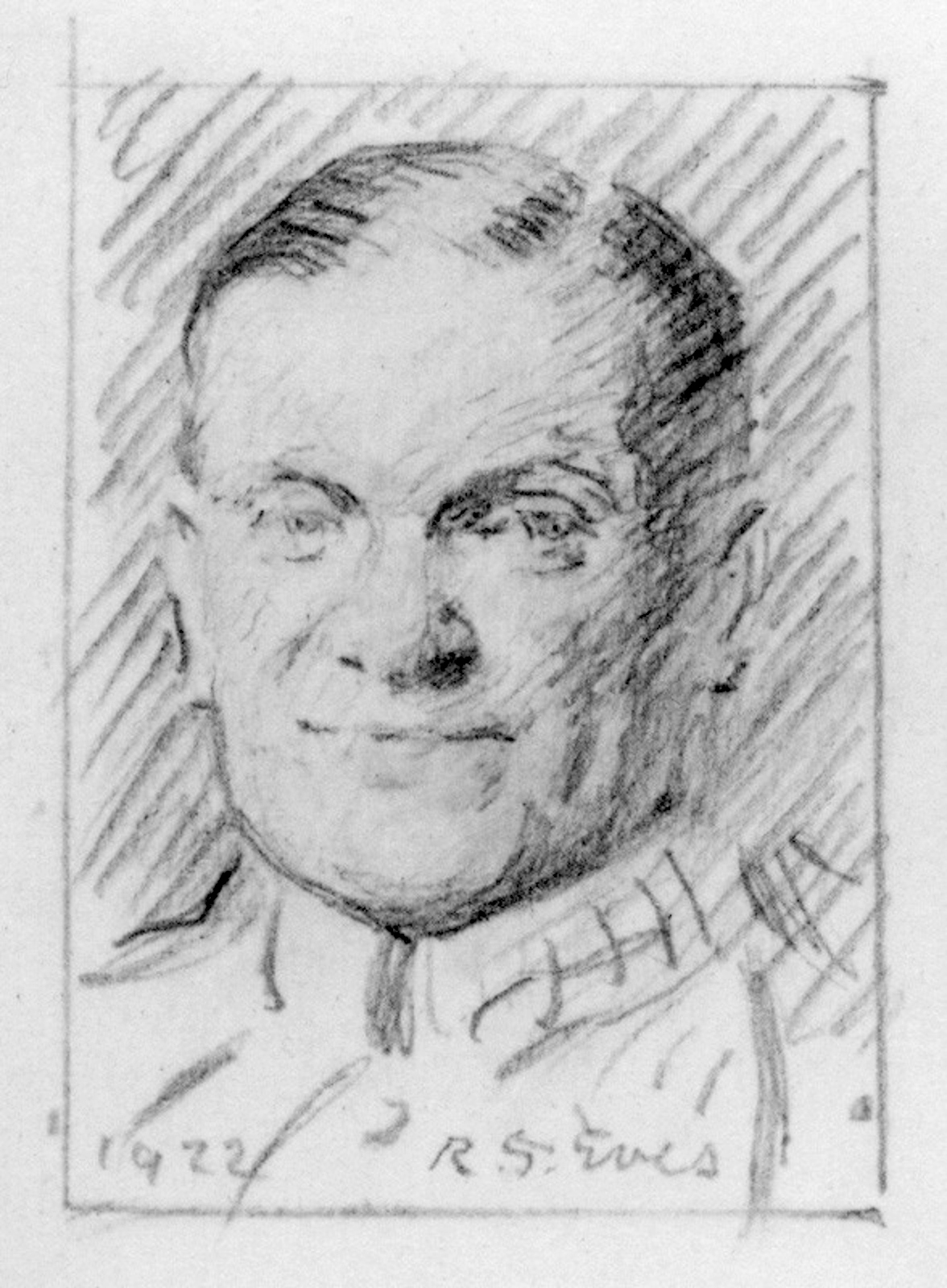
Edward Shortt

- Christopher Smart (1722–1771), 18th-century poet.

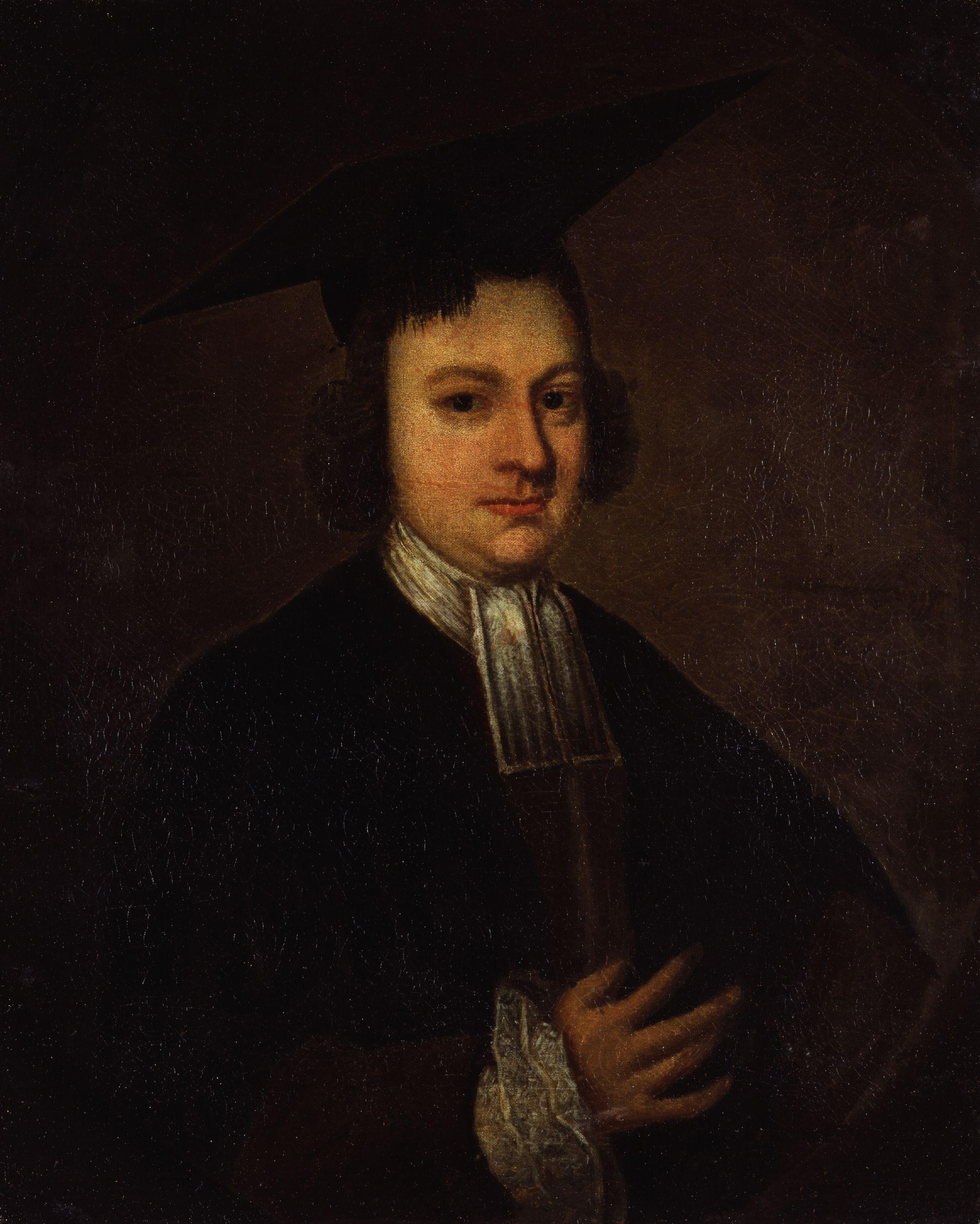
Christopher Smart

- Robert Spearman (1703–71), philosopher, eccentric theologian, author of An Enquiry After Philosophy and Theology.
- Charlie Spedding, winner of the 1984 London Marathon and bronze medal winner at the 1984 Olympic Games.
- Michael Stephenson (1981–), Newcastle Falcons RFC, Bath RFC.
- Joseph Stevenson (27 November 1806 – 8 February 1895), English Catholic archivist and editor of historical texts.
- Nigel Stock, Bishop to the Forces, Bishop at Lambeth, Bishop for the Falkland Islands.
- Mark Stockley-Haylock Guild Master of World of Warcraft esports clan and mythic plus team Digital Doom World rank 52.
- Robert Smith Surtees (1805–1864), comedy novelist, sports editor and founder of New Sporting Magazine.
- Charles Thorp, FRS (13 October 1783 – 10 October 1862), anti-slavery campaigner, environmentalist, educationalist, Fellow of the Royal Society, first warden of the University of Durham
- Will Todd, musician and composer.
- Dr. Henry Baker Tristram (1822–1906), canon, naturalist, travel writer, missionary and fellow of the Royal Society. Masonic Grand Chaplain of England. Founding member of British Ornithologists' Union.
- Dr. Thomas Hutchinson Tristram, Chancellor of London for 40 years. Doctor of Law. Last member of The Society of Doctor's Commons founded in 1511.
- Henry Yorke Trotter (1854–1934), Principal of the London Academy of Music for 30 years

== U to Z ==
- Sir Peter Vardy, entrepreneur and philanthropist.
- George Walker (mathematician), Mathematician, orator, preacher, abolitionist, composer, theologian
- Sir Hugh Seymour Walpole (13 March 1884 – 1 June 1941) CBE, Author, collector of art
- Mike Weston, Captain of British Lions and Manager of England Rugby in the first World Cup 1987.
- Robin Weston, Derbyshire, Durham, and Middlesex, county cricketer.
- Phil Weston, Derbyshire, Gloucestershire, and Worcestershire, county cricketer.
- Bishop George Howard Wilkinson (1833–1907), Bishop of St Andrews, Dunkeld and Dunblane and Primus of the Scottish Episcopal Church formerly Bishop of Truro.

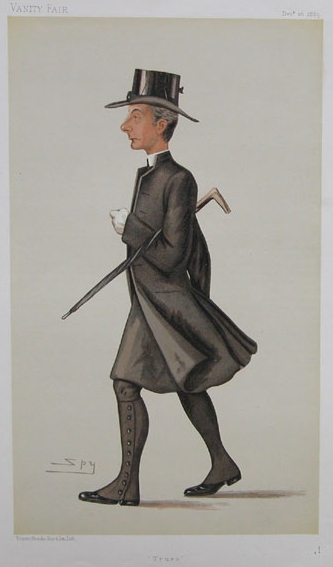
George Howard Wilkinson

- Micky Young, Bath Rugby, England Saxons, England 7s.

== Speculative ODs ==
There have been claims for certain individuals to be ODs over the years, research has not been able to rule them out, but not in either.

- John Balliol, King of Scotland, possibly attended Durham School before its official foundation in 1414.

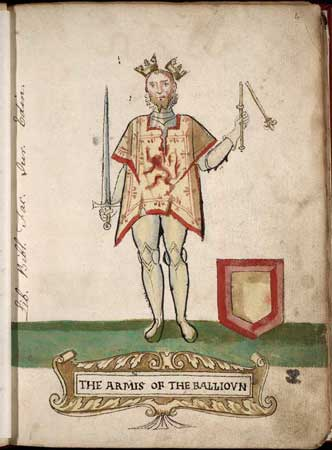
John Balliol

- Michael Scot, alias Scotus, Scott, and Michael the wizard, 13th-century mathematician, alchemist, scientist, linguist, philosopher and a character in Dante's Inferno

== Citation needed ==
These are believed to be ODs but do not have references at this point. They are here so that editors can assist by finding references to support their inclusion and move them into the relevant sections above.

- Sir Raleigh Grey KBE CMG CVO, pioneer of Rhodesia who took part in the Jameson Raid, a great-grandson of the first Earl Grey
- John Wesley Hales, editor, man of letters
- Thomas Knaggs, 17th-century preacher
- Alan Redpath, Christian evangelist and author
- Andrew Roseberry, Glamorgan and Leicestershire, county cricketer.
- John Warburton Sagar, England international rugby union player and diplomat.
- Lord Wyfold of Accrington (c. 1851–1937), formerly Colonel Sir Robert Trotter Hermon-Hodge, Bart., raised to the peerage for public services in the Great War
