= Arthur James Dingle =

England international rugby union player

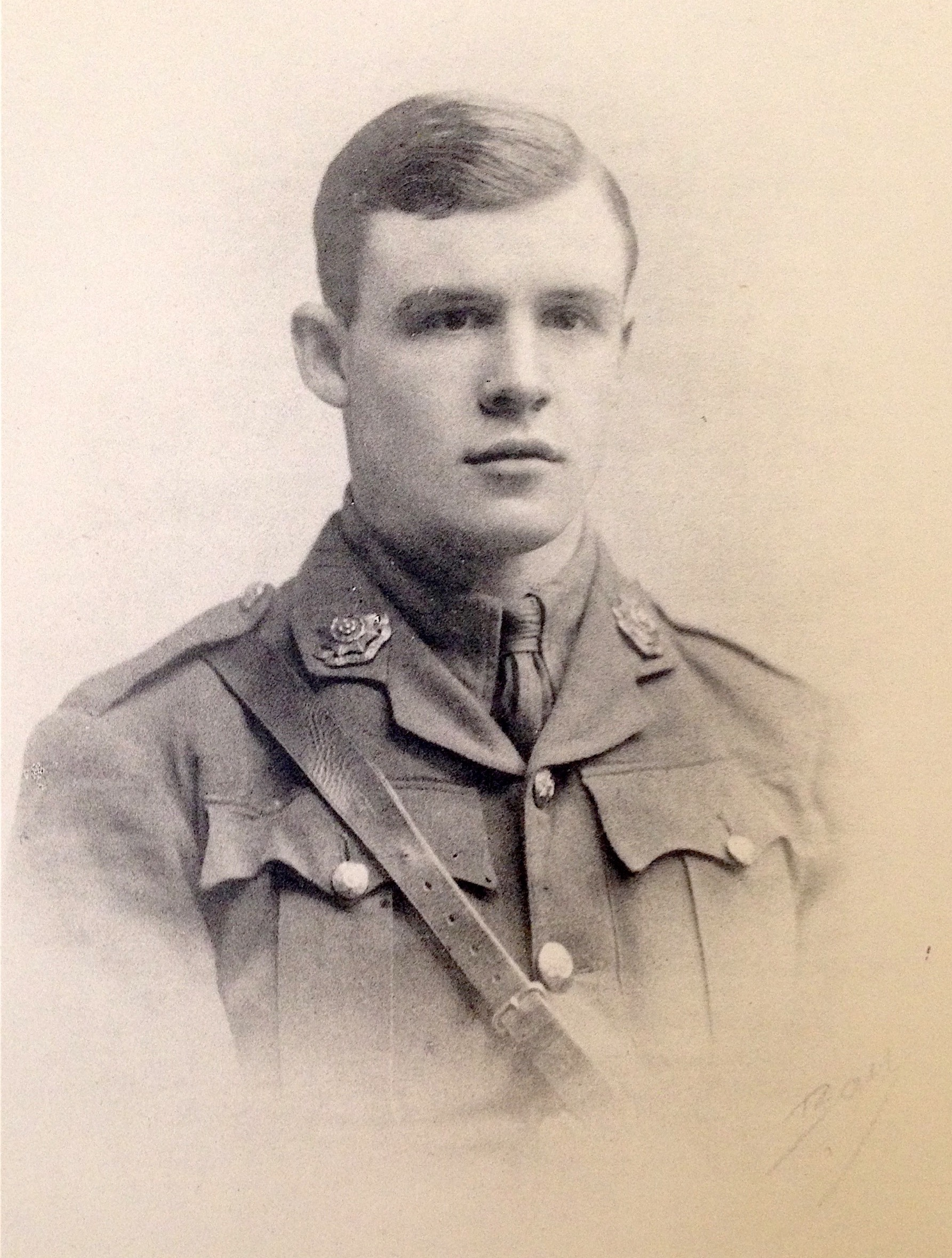
- Dingle in army uniform, 1914
- Born: 16 October 1891 Hetton-le-Hole, England
- Died: 22 August 1915 (aged 23) Scimitar Hill, Gallipoli, Turkey
- Height: 5 ft 7 in (1.70 m)
- Weight: 160 lb (73 kg)

Rugby union career
- Position(s): Centre, wing
Senior career
Years	Team	Apps	(Points)
1911–1912	Oxford University RFC	1	(3)
1913–1914	Hartlepool Rovers		(117)
1915	Barbarians	1	(3)
Provincial / State sides
Years	Team	Apps	(Points)
1913–1914	County Durham	7	(48)
International career
Years	Team	Apps	(Points)
1913–1914	England	3	(0)
- Military career
- Allegiance: United Kingdom
- Branch: British Army
- Service years: 1914–1915
- Rank: Captain
- Unit: 6th East Yorkshire Regiment
- Conflicts: Gallipoli Campaign: Suvla Bay Landing; Battle of Scimitar Hill †
- Memorials: Helles Memorial (panels 51–54)

Arthur "Mud" James Dingle (16 October 1891 – 22 August 1915) was a rugby union centre and wing, who won three caps for England, and played for County Durham, Hartlepool Rovers and Oxford University.

He was born and raised in County Durham, attending Durham School, where he was head boy and excelled at many sports, especially rugby. He went on to study at Keble College, Oxford, playing rugby for the college and captaining the team in his final year. He played in the 1911 Varsity Match, in which he scored a try. He was first selected for England in February 1913, against Ireland, although he had not been picked for Oxford that year. After graduating, he returned to Durham School as a master. He played for Hartlepool Rovers, scoring 55 tries in the 1913–14 season, as well as four hat-tricks for County Durham, helping them reach the County Championship finals. He was picked for England against Scotland and France in the last international matches before the outbreak of the First World War.

Dingle, who had been a member of the Oxford Officers Training Corps, was gazetted second lieutenant in the 6th Battalion, East Yorkshire Regiment, which took part in the Suvla Bay Landing of the Gallipoli Campaign on 6 August 1915. His battalion took Scimitar Hill on 9 August, with great loss of life, only to be forced to make a tactical withdrawal. On 21 August, the Battle of Scimitar Hill ensued, a disaster for Britain and her allies: Dingle was killed the following day, defending a trench that had earlier been captured. He is commemorated on the Helles Memorial to the missing dead.

== Early life ==
Arthur Dingle was born on 16 October 1891 at Hetton-le-Hole, County Durham, the eldest son of Beatrice (née Robson) and Reverend Arthur Trehane Dingle, Rector of Egglescliffe. He had a brother, Hugh John Dingle. Arthur attended Bow School, Durham and then Durham School, where he was head of school, and displayed an aptitude for cricket, gymnastics, rowing and rugby. He then went up to Keble College, Oxford in 1910, where he read theology in anticipation of being ordained.

== Rugby career ==
At Oxford, Dingle played for his college, Keble, and captained the team in his final year. He also played on Saturdays for Rosslyn Park, joining a school friend, Nowell Oxland at the club. He was soon selected to play for Oxford, at centre, winning his Blue in the 1911 Varsity Match. In front of 10,000 spectators at Queen's Club on 12 December, Cambridge were the clear favourites to win: Oxford had lost 5 of the previous 13 games. Under the leadership of Ronnie Poulton, however, Oxford won a decisive victory, leading 11–0 already at half time. In the second half, a further two tries — one from Dingle, which Poulton described as "magnificent" — sealed the victory, 19–0.

The following season, on 6 November 1912, Oxford hosted the South African team touring the United Kingdom and France. Dingle played at centre. It was a close contest, with South Africa coming through to win 6–0. After the Springboks' convincing victory over Cambridge a little later, Oxford were favourites to win the Varsity Match and to add to their winning series. Dingle was unable to play due to injury, missing a game that went against the odds.

Dingle got his first call up to the England national team to face Ireland on 8 February 1913, playing centre alongside Poulton, although he had not been selected to play for Oxford. The Times described his debut performance as 'strong in defence, but ... not altogether a success', while The Aberdeen Journal described him as 'fair', amongst a backline that was 'lacking in finishing power', with Poulton, 'poor'. England gained an 'easy' victory 15–4 but failed to turn their opportunities into points. Dingle was not picked for the next match, against Scotland on 15 March.

=== 1913–14 season ===
After he graduated, Dingle played for Richmond RFC and Surrey then, returning to Durham to become a master at his old school, he played for Hartlepool Rovers, and captained the team. At county level, he played for Durham, and had a significant part in helping the team reach the finals of the County Championship Tournament, scoring in each of the seven matches. In total, he scored 55 tries in the season, 39 for Hartlepool and a further 16 for Durham.

Early in the season, England played The South at Twickenham, winning 21–12, with outstanding performances from Dingle, as well as Johnson and Poulton. Dingle then played in the third and final trial against the Rest of England, which England won 42–27. His selection for the Five Nations came up for the match against Scotland, replacing Roberts on the left wing, who had had a poor game in the prior encounter against Ireland. Before the Scotland match on 21 March, Bill Maclagan described the English team as one of the best to visit Scotland. Having already defeated Wales and Ireland, England beat Scotland 15–16 in a close-fought game. Scotland, with the wind behind them, opened the scoring in the first half with a try but England equalised just before half time. After the break, England got up a lead of 6–16 and victory seemed certain. Scotland responded and closed the gap to one point. After Cherry Pillman's leg was broken in a tackle, England were playing with fourteen men, but they managed to hold on, thereby winning both the Triple Crown and the Calcutta Cup, as well as the Five Nations Championship. Dingle, in the opening minutes, missed a try-scoring opportunity when he knocked-on a pass from Poulton. Yet he had a positive impact in other parts of the game. It was England's last international test on British soil before the First World War: 11 of the 30 players went on to be killed in it, including the Scotsman William Middleton Wallace, who died the same day as Dingle.

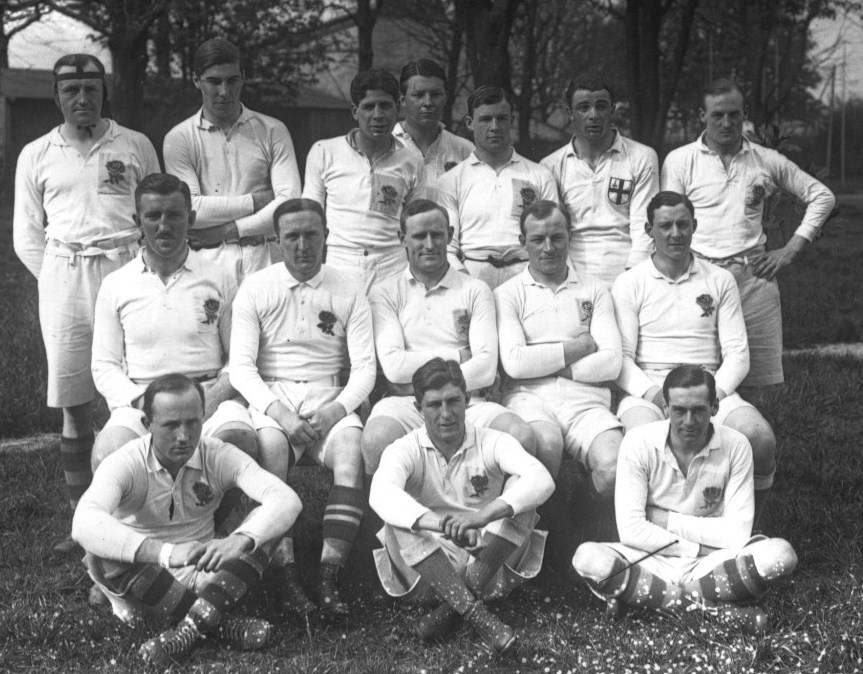
England XV v France, 13 April 1914, Colombes, France

Dingle was kept on for the final match of the tournament against France. England overwhelmed France in a 13–39 defeat, in which the French crowd's behaviour towards the visiting team was 'disorderly'. The Times was once again critical of Dingle's performance: 'AJ Dingle was the weakest of the four [threequarters]. He failed to take the passes and was very slow getting into his stride.'

With the outbreak of the First World War in 1914, competitive rugby matches were suspended. Despite this, Edgar Mobbs, the captain of the Barbarians invitation side, organised a match against the Royal Army Medical Corps (RAMC) on 10 April 1915. The Barbarians team on that day was made up of military personnel, including Dingle, who contributed a try towards a 10–3 victory. Of Dingle's team-mates on that day, both Mobbs and another England international Billy Geen, would also die in action during the war.

=== International appearances ===
Opposition	Score	Result	Date	Venue	Ref(s)
Ireland	4–15	Won	8 February 1913	Lansdowne Road, Dublin, Ireland	
Scotland	15–16	Won	21 March 1914	Inverleith, Scotland	
France	13–39	Won	13 April 1914	Colombes, France	

== Military service ==
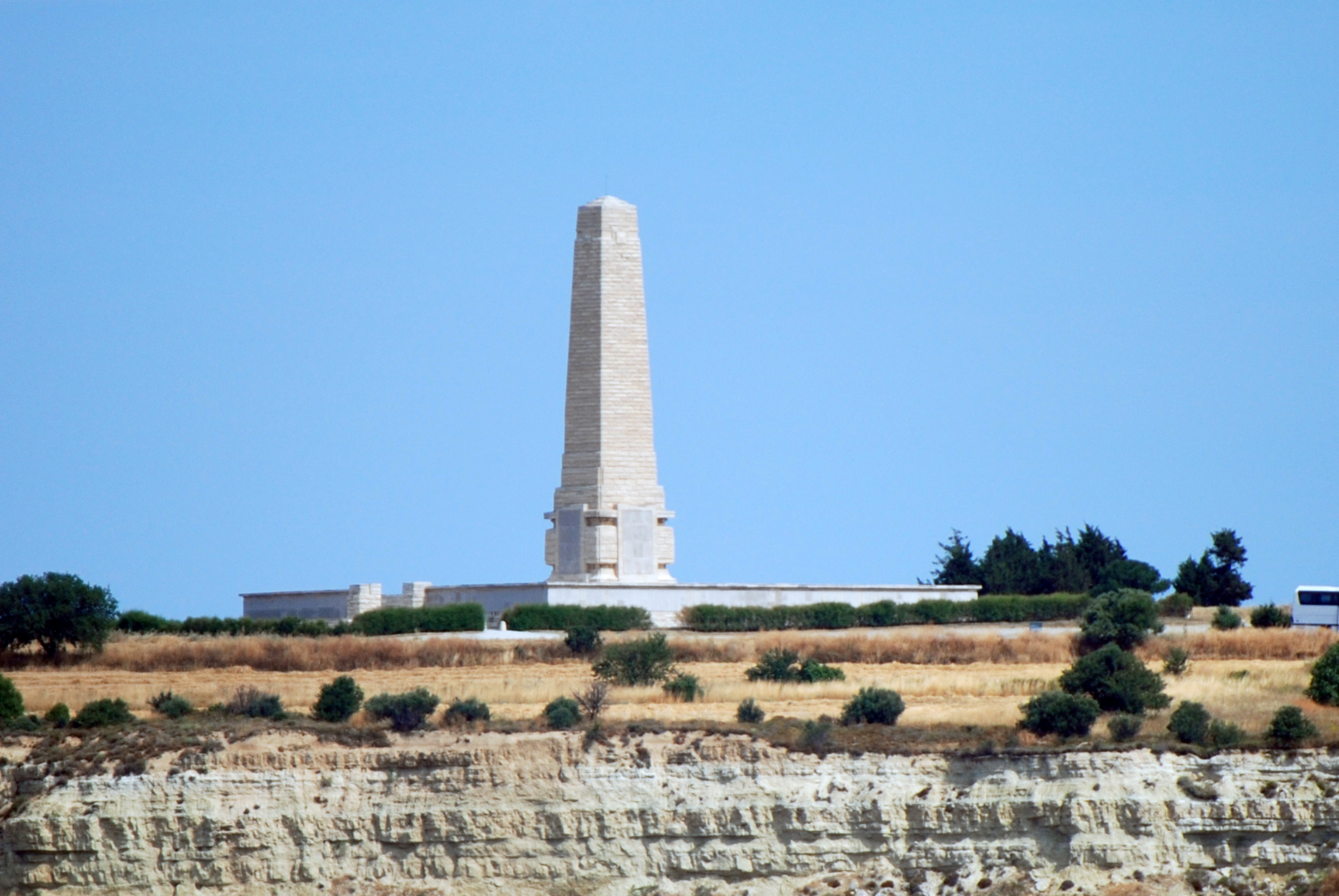
The Helles Memorial to the missing dead, where Capt Arthur Dingle is commemorated.

Since Dingle was a school master, he was exempt from military service, but having been a member of the Oxford University Officers Training Corps (OTC), and having set up the OTC at Durham School, he sought permission to enlist from the headmaster, Canon Budworth. He was commissioned on 29 August 1914 temporary second lieutenant into the 6th Battalion, East Yorkshire Regiment. He was promoted to temporary lieutenant on 8 December.

Dingle's regiment was sent to Gallipoli and took part in the Suvla Bay landings on 6 August 1915. His battalion soon took the small hill at Lala Baba, with the loss of many lives. Three days later, with Dingle made temporary captain, his battalion captured Scimitar Hill, once again with great loss of life, but then made a tactical withdrawal. On 21 August, with Dingle as acting commanding officer of the 150 men of B Company, the battalion was involved in the Battle of Scimitar Hill, a major assault to recapture the hill, which ended in disaster. Dingle was shot through the temple and killed at dawn on 22 August 1915, while defending a captured trench "against overwhelming odds". It was not possible to recover his body. Of his England team-mates who played Scotland in the final Calcutta Cup match in 1914 before the start of the war, three had already died: Bungy Watson, Francis Oakeley, and Ronald Poulton.

The Ballad of Suvla Bay by John Still, has these lines about Dingle:

- Broad and simple and great of heart,
- Strenuous of soul in a stalwart frame,
- Whatever the work he took his part,
- With energy strung from the very start
- To learn the rules and play the game.

- He'd played for an English side before,
- And all unspoiled by the crowd's applause,
- He took for his side their greeting roars.
- And so, in the greater game of war,
- He gave his life for his country's cause.

He is commemorated on panels 51 to 54 of the Helles Memorial to the missing. Other rugby internationals commemorated on the monument include the two Scotsmen William Campbell Church and Eric Templeton Young, and the Englishman William Nanson. There are also memorials to him at Durham School, St Margaret's Church in Durham, Keble College, Richmond, Rosslyn Park, Hartlepool Rovers and Oxford rugby club. There is also a tournament played amongst some of the first schools to adopt rugby, the Veterrimi IV, the winning team being awarded the AJ Dingle Cup.

== See also ==
- List of international rugby union players killed in action during the First World War
