= Veterrimi IV =

English school rugby union competition

- Current season or competition: 2015 Veterrimi IV
- Sport: Rugby union
- Inaugural season: 2010; 16 years ago
- Number of teams: 4
- Teams: Rugby School (1845) Sherborne School (1846); Durham School (1850); St Paul's School (1850) Cheltenham College (1844)
- Holders: St Paul's School (2015)
- Most titles: Rugby School (1 title); Durham School (1 title); St Paul's School (1 title)

The Veterrimi IV (veterrimi four or V4) was a rugby tournament between four of the oldest rugby playing schools in the world. The event was scheduled to be held biennially or triennially (every two to three years). "Veterrimi" is Latin for "oldest". The most recent edition of the tournament was contested in 2015.

== Conception ==
The idea for the Veterrimi IV tournament came from Durham School's director of sport, Ben Mason. To celebrate the long histories of playing rugby in English schools he conceived bringing four of the oldest of these clubs together to play a two-day tournament. On the first day participating in a round-robin tournament to qualify for a final and a third-fourth "wooden-spoon" match on the second day.

== Participants ==
Schools that have taken part in the tournament are:

School	Date school adopted rugby code	Dates of participation in V4	Notes
Rugby School	1845	2010	Rugby School is, of course, where the game of rugby football originated and was first codified. The "reductionist" Rugbeian origin myth gives 1823 as the year of William Webb-Ellis' indiscretion so this is commonly used as the date for the invention of the game; however running with the ball (the "distinctive feature of the rugby game") was not adopted until about 1830. Perhaps a more accurate date for the origin of the sport is 28 August 1845, the day that 37 Laws were first codified by W.D. Arnold, W.W. Shirley and F. Hutchins and approved by the Levee and Sixth (Heads of Houses, School Prefects and House Prefects). Rugby's first match against another school was in 1896 against Cheltenham College.
Sherborne School	1846	2010 2013 2015	Rugby was introduced to Sherborne School by the Rev. Charles Thomas Penrose, headmaster from 1846–1850. He was a former pupil of Rugby School and a Cambridge rowing blue, arriving at Sherborne as a vigorous 29-year-old with a love of sport.
Durham School	1850	2010 2013 2015	Rugby appears to have been introduced to Durham School in 1850, probably by masters who had been pupils at Rugby School. Durham School Football Club is frequently quoted as being the fourth oldest Rugby Club in the world.
St Paul's School	1850	2013 2015	Rugby was first played at St Paul's in 1850. The school is also one of the founder members of the Rugby Football Union; they commemorated this occasion by changing the colours of their playing kit to all-white.
Cheltenham College	1876	2010 2013 2015	Rugby is recorded as having been brought to Cheltenham College in 1844 by the Acton brothers, previously of School House at Rugby School; however the game at Cheltenham was played under local variations of the laws until 1876 when the Rugby Football Union's code was adopted. Cheltenham first played a match against another school in 1892 against Wellington College.

== Trophy ==
The winner of the Veterrimi IV tournament is awarded the AJ Dingle Trophy named in honour of Arthur James Dingle who was a pupil at Durham School, an Oxford Blue and who was capped three times for England playing on the wing. He participated in the very last Five Nations match before the outbreak of war before joining the East Yorkshire Regiment and, after a failed attack during the largest battle of the Gallipoli campaign, he was listed as missing presumed killed. His body was never found.

== Inaugural tournament (Durham 2010) ==
The first tournament was hosted by Durham School, taking place on Saturday 23 October. There was unrelenting rain but the supporters turned out in their hundreds to be part of this special day. Durham School and Rugby School battled it out in the final, with the A J Dingle Trophy finally going to Rugby School. The event received extensive coverage by the national and local press as well as specialist rugby media including Sky Sports Rugby Club News, Sky Sports News, BBC Look North and Metro Radio.

=== Round robin ===
Matches

Team 1	Score	Team 2
Durham	7–10	Rugby
Cheltenham	5–0	Sherborne
Durham	8–0	Cheltenham
Rugby	7–10	Sherborne
Durham	10–0	Sherborne
Rugby	10–0	Cheltenham

Final standings

Team	Pld	W	D	L	Pts
Rugby	3	2	0	1	27
Durham	3	2	0	1	25
Sherborne	3	1	0	2	10
Cheltenham	3	1	0	2	5

=== Knockout ===
Third place playoff
1	Sherborne	17
2	Cheltenham	12

Final
1	Durham	5
2	Rugby	7

== Second tournament (Sherborne 2013) ==
Rugby School, having won the first tournament, dropped out of the second; St Paul's School took their place. Sherborne were missing two players, both of whom had been selected to play for England U18 against Leicester Academy. The first four games on the first day finished with two out of two wins for St Paul's and Durham. The remaining two games being unnecessary to decide the finalists it was decided that straight finals would be played on the Sunday with Durham and St Paul's in the main final and Sherborne and Cheltenham playing in the 3rd/4th place play-off. After day 1 of the competition Sherborne School hosted a black tie dinner for parents and players with guest speaker John Bentley. Durham were presented with the AJ Dingle cup by Tim Stirk (OD), president of England Rugby Football Schools Union.

=== Round robin ===
Matches

Team 1	Score	Team 2
St Paul's	13–12	Sherborne
Cheltenham	7–17	Durham
Durham	12–8	Sherborne
St Paul's	27–0	Cheltenham
Sherborne	–	Cheltenham
Durham	–	St Paul's

Final standings

Team	Pld	W	D	L	Pts
St Paul's	2	2	0	0	40
Durham	2	2	0	0	29
Sherborne	2	0	0	2	20
Cheltenham	2	0	0	2	0

=== Knockout ===
Third place playoff
1	Sherborne	17
2	Cheltenham	14

Final
1	Durham	15
2	St Paul's	10

== Third tournament (Cheltenham 2015) ==
The next occurrence of the event was held by Cheltenham between Friday 30 October and Sunday 1 November 2015. The first round of matches started at 10 am, the second round at 12 noon with a hog roast between 12 noon and 2 pm. The teams taking part were Cheltenham, Durham, Sherborne and St Paul's. St Paul's won this third edition of the series.

=== Round robin ===
Matches

Kick-off	Pitch	Team 1	Score	Team 2
Sat; 10:00	1	Cheltenham	5-23	St Paul's
Sat; 10:00	2	Durham	10–10	Sherborne
Sat; 12:00	1	Cheltenham	7-29	Durham
Sat; 12:00	2	Sherborne	0–0	St Paul's
Sun; 10:00	1	Cheltenham	0–0	Sherborne
Sun; 10:00	2	Durham	5-15	St Paul's

Final standings

Team	Pld	W	D	L	Pts
St Paul's School	3	3	0	0	9
Durham School	3	1	1	1	5
Sherborne School	3	1	1	1	5
Cheltenham College	3	0	0	3	3

=== Knockout ===
Third place playoff
1	Sherborne School	17
2	Cheltenham College	5

Final
1	Durham School	5
2	St Paul's School	22

== Fourth tournament (2017) ==
There is, as yet, no host determined for the fourth tournament.

=== Round robin ===
Matches

Team 1	Score	Team 2
Team A	0–0	Team B
Team C	0–0	Team D
Team A	0–0	Team C
Team B	0–0	Team D
Team D	0–0	Team A
Team C	0–0	Team B

Final standings

Team	Pld	W	D	L	Pts
Team W	0	0	0	0	0
Team X	0	0	0	0	0
Team Y	0	0	0	0	0
Team Z	0	0	0	0	0

=== Knockout ===
Third place playoff
1	Team Y	0
2	Team Z	0

Final
1	Team W	0
2	Team X	0

== See also ==
http://www.schoolssports.com/CompetitionMicrosite/?TID=0d8664a6-cee1-4cba-b72c-b554fb3b3603
