= Thomas Renton Elliott =

Thomas Renton Elliott CBE, DSO
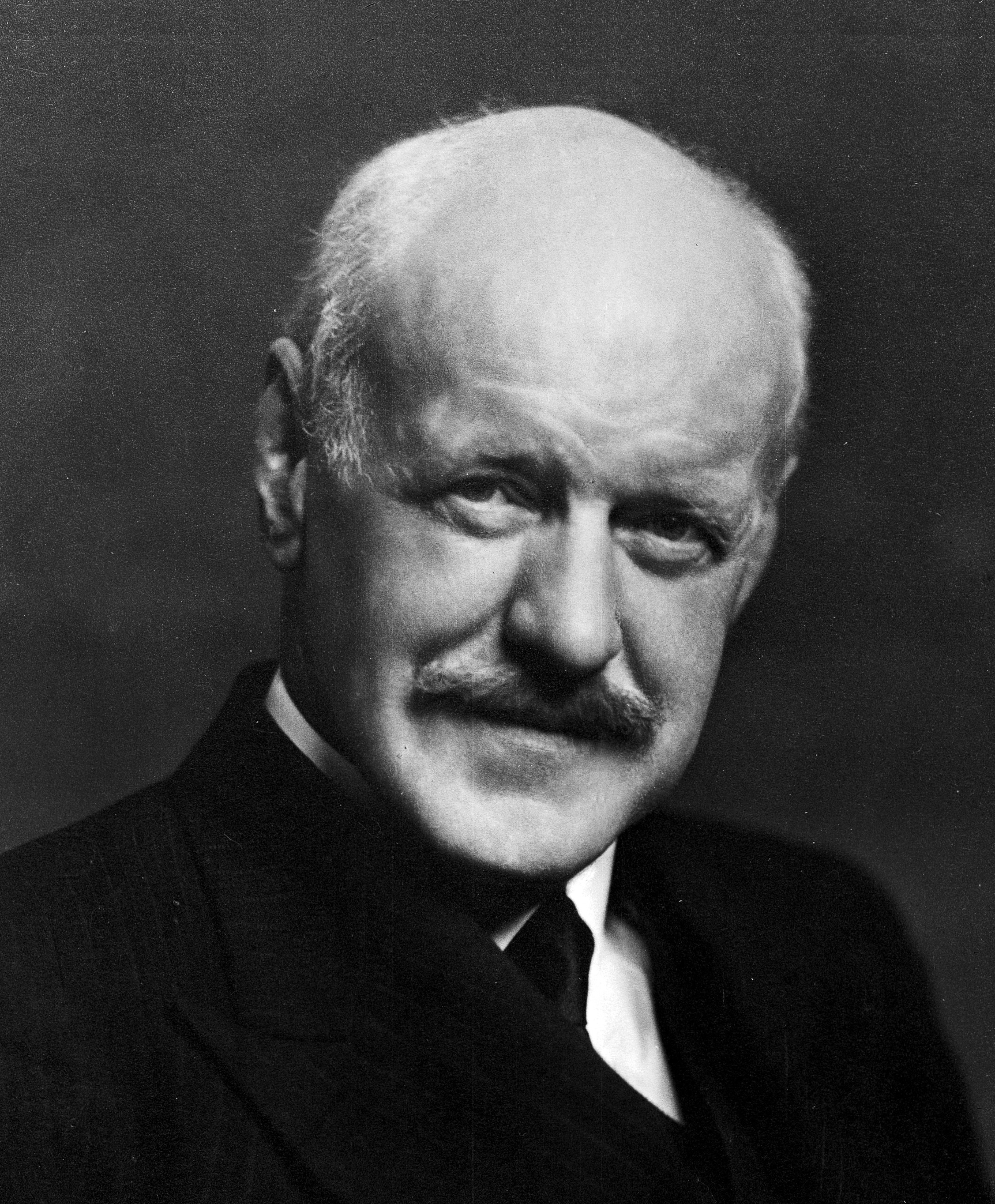
- Born: 11 October 1877; Willington, County Durham, England
- Died: 4 March 1961 (aged 83); Broughton Place, Peeblesshire, Scotland
- Education: Durham School; Trinity College, Cambridge
- Employer: University College Hospital
- Known for: Investigation of the chemical transmission of nerve action
- Relatives: John Eliot
- Scientific career
- Notable students: Harold Percival Himsworth
- Military career
- Branch: British Army
- Service years: 1914-1918
- Rank: Colonel

Thomas Renton Elliott CBE DSO FRCP FRS (11 October 1877 – 4 March 1961) was a British physician and physiologist.

== Biography ==
Elliott was born in Willington, County Durham, as the eldest son to retailer Archibald William Elliott and his wife, Anne, daughter of Thomas Renton, of Otley, Yorkshire. He studied natural sciences at Trinity College, Cambridge, specialising in physiology. He carried out research within the Department of Physiology at Cambridge under J N Langley.

Although older than most students he joined University College Hospital to study in 1906, and became a junior staff member - Assistant Physician- in 1910. He would become the first professor of medicine and director of the medical unit at Gower Street, London.

Elliott joined the Officers' Training Corps and in September 1914, joined Sir John Rose Bradford, as medical consultant to the British Expeditionary Force in France. He rose to the rank of colonel and was twice mentioned in dispatches. At the end of the war he received the DSO and was made CBE in 1919. He was one of four editors of the two volumes on the medical services for the Official History of the Great War

Elliot married Martha McCosh in 1918. They lived in Cheyne Walk in Chelsea, London and had three sons and two daughters. One son was judge Archie Elliott, Lord Elliott.

In 1935, Elliott and his wife commissioned the architectural practice of Rowand Anderson, Paul & Partners to build their house Broughton Place in the Scottish Borders. It was designed by Basil Spence, then a partner in the firm, who worked closely with Mrs Elliott to meet her requirements. Work began in 1936 and was completed in 1938.

Elliott retired as professor of medicine 1939. He served on the Goodenough committee on medical education.

Elliott died at Broughton House in 1961.

== Awards and memberships ==
- Distinguished Service Order (1918)
- Honorary member of the Association of American Physicians
- Honorary member of the Rome Academy of Medicine
- Gold medal of the West London MedicoChirurgical Society (1920)
- Honorary Fellow of Trinity College, Cambridge (1947)
- Member of the Medical Research Council (three terms 1920–1931 and 1939–1943)
- Fellow of the Royal Society
- Old Dunelmian
- Trustee Beit Memorial Fellowships for Medical Research
- Interdepartmental Committee on Medical Schools (1842–1944)
- Trustee Wellcome Trust (1936- )

== Works ==
- Macpherson, Sir William Grant; Herringham, Sir Wilmot Parker; Elliott, T. R.; Balfour, Sir Andrew, eds. (1922). Medical Services: Diseases of the War. History of the Great War. Vol. I. London: HMSO. OCLC 816503858.
- Macpherson, Sir W. G.; Herringham, Sir W. P.; Elliott, Colonel Thomas Renton; Balfour, Sir Andrew, eds. (1923). Medical Services: Diseases of the War: Including the Medical Aspects of Aviation and Gas Warfare and Gas Poisoning in Tanks and Mines. History of the Great War. Vol. II. London: HMSO. OCLC 729637196.
