= Thomas Knaggs =

English theologian

Thomas Knaggs (c.1661 – 12 May 1724) was a Christian preacher and publisher of sermons.

He was born about 1661 in County Durham, England, and nothing is known of his early life.

He was educated at Durham School. He was admitted as a sizar at Emmanuel College, Cambridge 1 June 1676. He matriculated in 1677, earned his BA in 1679 and MA in 1683. He had been ordained as a deacon of York in 1681. He was Vicar of Merrington in County Durham from 1682 to 1720. He was afternoon lecturer at All Saints, Newcastle from 1687 to 1697.

He was Chaplain to Ford Grey, Lord Grey. He was Vicar of Croft, Lincolnshire from 1720 and a lecturer at St Giles in the Fields in London. He was an officiating minister at Holy Trinity, Knightsbridge from 1699 to 1713. He died on 12 May 1724 at the age of 63.

It is not known whom he married, but his son (also Thomas) was baptised 5 March 1691 in Newcastle. This son was also admitted to Emmanuel College, Cambridge, and died there on 31 July 1709.

== Sermons published ==
Taken from the British Library online catalogue.

- 1689 - An Exhortation to a Personal and National Repentance. A sermon preached at St. James Church, Westminster, Feb. 5. 1688/9.
- 1693 - A sermon [on Psal. lxiv. 9] preached before the ... Lord Mayor ... [of London] ... Nov. 5, 1693.
- 1695 - A sermon preach'd at All-Hallows in New Castle upon Tyne, on the 22d. of September, 1695. Being the day of Thanksgiving to almighty God for the taking the town and castle of Namur, and for protecting his Majesty's sacred person. By Tho. Knaggs, M. A. and chaplain to the right honourable Ford, Earl of Tankerville: (London: printed for Richard Baldwin, near the Oxford-Arms in Warwick-Lane, 1695), by Thomas Knaggs (HTML at EEBO TCP)
- 1696 - A sermon [on 1 Thess. v. 19] preacht ... on the 16th day of April, 1696, being the thanksgiving day to Almighty God for ... disappointing a ... conspiracy of Papists ... to assassinate ... his ... Majesty’s royal person, etc.
- 1697 - An Assize Sermon [on Acts xxiv. 16] preach’d at St Edmunds-Bury ... March 23, 1696/7, etc.
- 1698 - A sermon [on Prov. xxvii. 1] preached ... at Colchester, ... at the funeral of Mrs. E. Knaggs.
- 1700 - A Sermon preach’d at Trinity-Chappel in the Parish of St. Martins in the Fields, Feb. 4th. 1700.
- 1701 - A sermon [on Heb. iv. 13] against profaneness & immorality, ... preach’d at the Assizes, at Kingston upon Thames, April 9, etc.
- 1701 - A sermon [on Prov. xiv. 9] against atheism, preach’d ... Novemb. 24, 1700.
- 1702 - Divine Providence. A sermon [on Prov. xxiii. 17, 18], etc.
- 1702 - The vanity of the world. A sermon preach’d at Trinity-Chappel in the parish of St. Martin in the Fields, the Wednesday after the funeral of King William the Third ...
- 1705 - A sermon [on 2 Cor. xiii. 11] against the French King.
- 1706 - God with us: A sermon [on 1 Pet. iii. 13] preach’d ... May 19, 1706, in a thankful remembrance for ... the late glorious victory obtain’d in Brabant, ... under the command of the duke of Marlborough, etc.
- 1708 - The Excellency of a Good Name. A sermon [on Prov. xxii. 1] preach’d October 31, 1708. After the ... death of ... Prince George of Denmark ...
- 1708 - A sermon [on 1 Kings xix. 4] against self-murder, etc.
- 1708 - A sermon [on Heb. xii. 5, 6] being a persuasive to contentment under afflictions.
- 1708 - A sermon [on Mark vi. 12] being an exhortation to a personal and national repentance.
- 1708 - A sermon [on Ps. cvi. 21] preach’d ... Aug. 19, 1708, being the thanksgiving day for the late great victory obtain’d ... near Audenarde, by her Majesties forces, ... under the command of the duke of Marlborough.
- 1709 - A thanksgiving sermon [on Luke xvii. 15, 16] for our many deliverances, particularly the Victory obtain’d, near Mons, etc.
- 1710 - A sermon [on Ps. xvi. 12] preach’d ... at the funeral of the Honourable Mrs E. Roberts, etc.
- 1712 - God governs the World ... a sermon [on Matt. vi. 34] preach’d ... Jan. 16, 1711/12, being the day appointed for a publick fast to implore a blessing on a secure and lasting peace, or a successful war.
- 1714 - A sermon [on Luke viii. 52] preach’d on the death of the Princess Sophia, Electress Dowager of Hanover, etc.
- 1714 - A sermon preach’d in the Parish-Church of St. Giles’s in the Fields ... the seventh of February, 1713/14. being the Sunday after the death of His Grace, Dr. John Sharp, Lord Archbishop of York, etc.
- 1716 - A Sermon [on John v. 14] preach’d ... the tenth of June ... 1716, etc.
- 1716 - Haman and Mordecai. A sermon [on Esther v. 13].
- 1717 - A sermon [on Heb. xii. 14] preach’d on ... the anniversary of His Majesty’s ... Coronation.
- 1717 - The Martyrdom of King Charles the First. In a Sermon [on 2 Sam. xviii. 3], etc.
- 1718 - The true Fear of the Lord and the King. A sermon [on Prov. xxiv. 21, 22] preach’d ... the day of His Majesty’s ... Accession, etc.
- 1720 - The Cruelty and Tyranny of Popery, a sermon [on Ps cxxiv. 5] preach’d before the ... Lord Mayor, on the fifth of November.
- 1721 - Religion the properest means to Peace of Conscience, Honour, Profit, Pleasure, and Health: A sermon [on Isa. lvii. 21], etc.
