= Henry Watson Fox =

Church of England missionary (1817–1848)

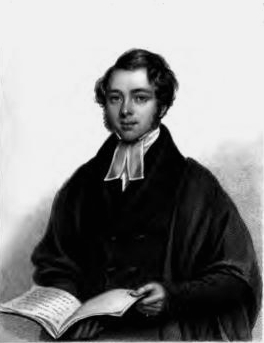
- Born: 1817
- Died: 1848 (aged 30–31)
- Education: Wadham College, Oxford

Henry Watson Fox (1817–1848) was a Church of England missionary to the Telugu people of south India.

== Early life ==
The son of George Townshend Fox (died 1848) of Durham and his wife Ann Stote Crofton, he was born at Westoe in 1817. William Fox, Prime Minister of New Zealand, was an elder brother. His father was a rope maker and merchant; his mother, daughter of a shipowner, was heiress to property at Harton, South Shields.

Fox was sent to Durham grammar school, and then to Rugby School, where he was in the house of Bonamy Price. In 1836 Fox gained one of the university exhibitions, and matriculated at Wadham College, Oxford in March. He came into residence at Wadham in October of that year. He graduated B.A. in December 1839.

== Vocation ==
At school, Fox had been impressed by a lecture delivered by his housemaster Price in 1833; and the religious content of weekly sermons of Thomas Arnold, the headmaster. In 1835 he was reading the tract The Dairyman's Daughter by Legh Richmond.

Fox spent the winter of 1839 in Brighton with Henry Venn Elliott, an evangelical pastor and supporter of the Church Missionary Society (CMS). In discussing the possibility of mission work, Elliott mentioned the appeal issued in 1839 by the Rev. John Tucker, a Fellow of Corpus Christi College, Oxford. Tucker was in Madras, as secretary of the CMS committee there, and asked for Protestant missionaries to the Telugu people. Fox was struck with the idea of this missionary work. He consulted friends, and after prayer and consideration adopted it.

== Missionary ==
Fox was ordained deacon in December 1840. Early in 1841 the CMS appointed him a missionary to the Telugu people, inhabiting the northeastern districts of the Madras Presidency. Administratively the mission was to the Northern Circars subdivision of the Presidency. It included Masulipatam (now more correctly known as Machilipatnam), which became British territory through the siege of Masulipatam. While Tucker had referred to the "Telugu country" having been under British government "for eighty years", that applied to Masulipatam, rather than the subdivision as a whole. The Nizam of Hyderabad had formal possession of the Northern Circars until 1823. Masulipatam, also known as Bunder, was in Kistna district, now the Krishna district of Andhra Pradesh.

In July 1841 Fox reached Madras with his wife Elizabeth and a colleague, the Rev. Robert Turlington Noble. Noble (1810–1864) was a Cambridge graduate, ordained priest in 1840. He ran an exclusive school at Masulipatam for Indians, which became Noble College, Machilipatnam. Fox, as soon as he had mastered the language, became a peripatetic preacher to the people in Masulipatam and the adjoining district.

Poor health compelled Fox to reside at Ootacamund in the Nilgiri hills for much of the period from 1843 to October 1844, with the exception of some time spent on a tour among the mission stations of Travancore and Tinnivelly. His wife became ill with hepatitis. She died off Madras in November 1845, shortly before beginning a return journey to the United Kingdom. The practical needs of his young children, one of whom (Johnny), already ill at Masulipatam, died shortly after his mother, required Fox to make the return journey himself.

Fox was in the United Kingdom from March to October 1846. He then returned to Masulipatam and his itinerant preaching, for about a year.

== Last year and death ==
In 1848 Fox was obliged by his own health finally to return to England. He was able a few months later to accept the appointment of assistant secretary to the Church Missionary Society. On 14 October 1848, after a severe attack of the dysentery which afflicted him, he died in his mother's house at Durham.

A funeral sermon for Fox was preached by John Tucker on 22 October 1848. A memoir was published in 1850 by his eldest brother George, with a preface by Henry Venn Elliott. George Townshend Fox the younger had matriculated at Trinity College, Cambridge in 1844, as a mature student, and was ordained in the Church of England in 1848.

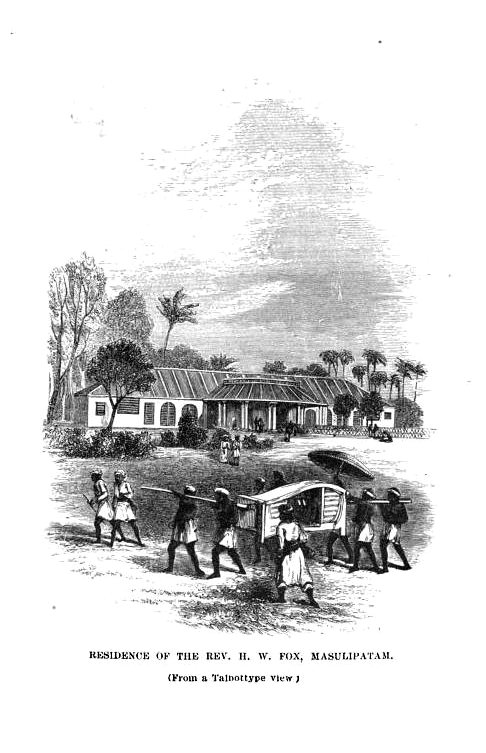
Illustration from A Memoir of the Rev. Henry Watson Fox, residence of Henry Watson Fox in Masulipatam (engraved after a talbotype)

== Works ==
In 1846, while in England, Fox wrote a short book, Chapters on Missions in South India. It was published a few months before his death, giving a popular account of mission life in India, and of his observations of Hindu religion and manners. He wrote a hymn "I hear a thousand voices singing" in 1848, for the 50th anniversary the following year of the Church Missionary Society.

== Legacy ==
Fox's letters and journals show his commitment to missionary work and the spread of missions.

Shortly after Fox's death subscriptions were raised by his friends at Rugby and elsewhere, which resulted in the endowment of a Rugby-Fox mastership in the Church Mission School, now called the Noble College, at Masulipatam. It was at the same time arranged that an annual sermon should be preached in the Rugby School chapel at Rugby, to raise funds for the endowment of the Masulipatam school..The Rugby Fox Memorial Fund was a charity, in existence to 2003. Its initial committee included Valpy French, who encountered Fox as a speaker in 1846 at a breakfast meeting in Trinity College, Oxford, and to whom Fox then wrote from India; and Henry Hayne who in 1846 married at Durham, as his second wife, Isabella Paine Fox (died 1859), Fox's elder sister.

The first "Rugby-Fox sermon" was given on 1 November 1848, by Archibald Campbell Tait. It was attended by John Sharp, then a pupil at Rugby School. He was later a master at the Masulipatam school, and then from 1865 to 1870, and 1872 to 1878, Noble's successor as its principal. He was succeeded by Noel Hodges, and went on to be a Telugu language lecturer at the University of Cambridge.

In 1872 the Rugby-Fox preacher was Fox's son, the Rev. Henry Elliott Fox.

A pamphlet from 1852, Posthumous Fragment, consisting of an unpublished article by Fox, with a "Notice of the Extent of His Influence", mentions R. Marsh Hughes, a military officer with the East India Company, later manager of the Strangers' Home for Asiatics, Africans and South Sea Islanders in London, and the convert James White from Sierra Leone.

== Family ==
In 1840 Fox married Elizabeth James (died 1845), daughter of G. H. James of Wolverhampton. Their son Henry Elliott Fox (1841–1926) was born at Masulipatam. Fox returned to England in 1846, to place his surviving son Henry and daughter with his parents. Mary Isabella Fox, the daughter, also born at Masulipatam, married in 1887 as the second wife of Rev. Edward Lombe (died 1909). She died in Torquay in 1942, at age 99.
