= John Wesley Hales =

British scholar and man of letters

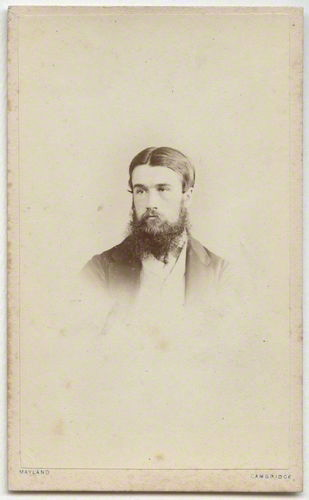
John Wesley Hales

John Wesley Hales (Ashby de la Zouch, Leicestershire, 5 October 1836 - London, 19 May 1914), was a British scholar and man of letters.

== Life ==
John Wesley Hales was educated at Louth grammar school, Glasgow High School, Durham School, Glasgow University and Christ's College, Cambridge, which elected him to a fellowship. He was for some time an assistant master at Marlborough College under George Granville Bradley, as well as examiner at King's College London, and the universities of Wales, New Zealand and Cambridge, and from 1889 to 1893 Clark lecturer on English literature at Trinity College, Cambridge. Until 1903, when he retired, he was professor of English literature at King's College London.

In May 1901 he was elected an Honorary Fellow of Christ's College, Cambridge.

He married Henrietta Trafford, daughter of judge Richard Leigh Trafford and Eliza Frances Tarleton, in 1867.

== Works ==
Hales published 109 works in 300 publications in 5 languages. A selection is shown below.

- Bell's Handbooks of English Literature (general editor)
- Milton's Areopagitica (1874)
- Percy Folio Manuscript (1867–8) (co-editor)
- Longer English Poems (1872, 1884) (editor)
- Notes and Essays on Shakespeare (1884)
- Essays and Notes on Shakespeare (1892)
- Folia Litteraria: Essays and Notes on English Literature (1893)
- Snell's Age of Chaucer and Seccombe (introduction)
- Allen's Age of Shakespeare
- The Eve of St. Agnes by John Keats with Philological and Explanatory Notes by J.W. Hales (1889)

=== Contributions to the Dictionary of National Biography, 1885-1900 ===
- William Langland

=== Edited works ===
- Complete Works of Edmund Spenser: A Variorum Edition (1893)
