= Broughton Place, Scottish Borders =

Coordinates: 55.62152°N 3.40594°W

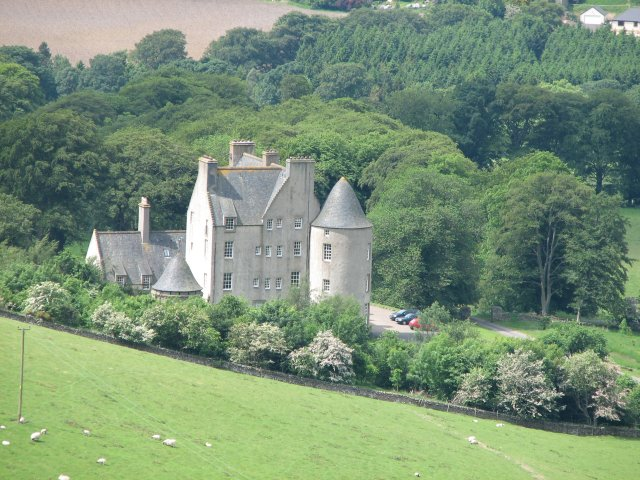
Broughton Place in 2006

Broughton Place is a historic house in the village of Broughton, Scottish Borders. It was designed by Basil Spence in the style of a 17th-century Scottish Baronial tower house.

== History ==
In 1935, professor Thomas Renton Elliott, and his wife commissioned the Edinburgh architectural practice of Rowand Anderson, Paul & Partners to build the house. It was designed by the young and still unknown Basil Spence, then a partner in the firm, in a style far removed from his later modernist architecture. He worked closely with Mrs Elliott to meet her requirements. Work began in 1936 and was completed in 1938.

The house is brick-built and Harled, with wooden panelling and decorative plaster ceilings in the interior. The sculptor Hew Lorimer contributed a pair of relief panels and a pair of lion gateposts.

Broughton Place is situated on the site of an earlier house owned by John Murray of Broughton, secretary to Bonnie Prince Charlie during the Jacobite Rising of 1745.

== Current use ==
The house was converted into flats in 1975. Until 2010, the ground floor housed a commercial art gallery, the Broughton Gallery, established in 1976, offering contemporary British art and crafts.

== See also ==
- List of places in the Scottish Borders
- List of places in Scotland
