= Hall Charlton =

English rugby union player

- Born: Hall Christopher Charlton; 25 October 1979 (age 47) Durham, England
- Height: 1.80 m (5 ft 11 in)
- Weight: 88 kg (13 st 12 lb)
- School: Durham School
- University: Newcastle University

Rugby union career
- Position: Scrum-half
- Current team: Newcastle Falcons
Youth career
- Durham City
Senior career
Years	Team	Apps	(Points)
1998–2011	Newcastle Falcons	153	(50)

Hall Christopher Charlton (born 25 October 1979 in Durham) is an English former rugby union player who represented Newcastle Falcons as a scrum-half.

== Career ==
Whilst at Newcastle he was a replacement in both the 2001 and 2004 Anglo-Welsh Cup finals as Newcastle emerged victorious from both.

He left Newcastle in 2011 to join Blaydon RFC, who were then managed by his former Newcastle team-mate Micky Ward.

=== International career ===
In 2004 he was called up to the senior England squad for the Investec Challenge match against Canada, but he remained on the bench and was ultimately never capped at that level.
