= John Askew =

English cricketer and rugby union player

Personal information
- Full name: John Garbutt Askew
- Born: 2 September 1908; Gateshead, Tyne and Wear, England
- Died: 31 August 1942 (aged 33); Stannington, Northumberland, England
- Nickname: Jack
- Batting: Right-handed

Domestic team information
- Years: Team
- 1931: Cambridge University
- 1928–1931: Durham

Career statistics
Competition	First-class
Matches	2
Runs scored	30
Batting average	7.50
100s/50s	–/–
Top score	11
Balls bowled	–
Wickets	–
Bowling average	–
5 wickets in innings	–
10 wickets in match	–
Best bowling	–
Catches/stumpings	1/–
- Source: Cricinfo, 9 April 2012

John Garbutt Askew (2 September 1908 – 31 August 1942) was an English rugby player and first-class cricketer. In rugby, Askew played as a fullback, while in cricket he played as a right-handed batsman. He was born at Gateshead, County Durham.

Askew was educated at Durham School. He made his debut in county cricket for Durham against Northumberland in the 1928 Minor Counties Championship. He played Minor counties cricket for Durham from 1928 to 1931, making eight appearances. He later attended Emmanuel College, Cambridge, where he made two first-class appearances for Cambridge University Cricket Club in 1931, against Sussex and the touring New Zealanders. He scored a total of 30 runs at an average of 7.50 in his two appearances, with a high score of 11.

In rugby union, Askew played club rugby for Durham City from 1925 to 31, Durham County from 1926 to 31, and Cambridge University from 1929 to 1931. He also appeared for the Barbarians. Askew was capped by England three times, playing in the 1930 Five Nations Championship against Wales, Ireland and France.

In 1932, he was serving in the Colonial Service in Nyasaland, but was invalided home. He was also a member of the Durham Light Infantry, in which he held the rank of second lieutenant. Between 1933 and 1937, he was in business with his father, while in 1937 he went to South Africa, where he spent a year farming. In 1939, he had returned to England and was in business in Newcastle. He died at Stannington, Northumberland, on 31 August 1942.
