= William Middleton Wallace =

Scotland international rugby union player

Willie Wallace
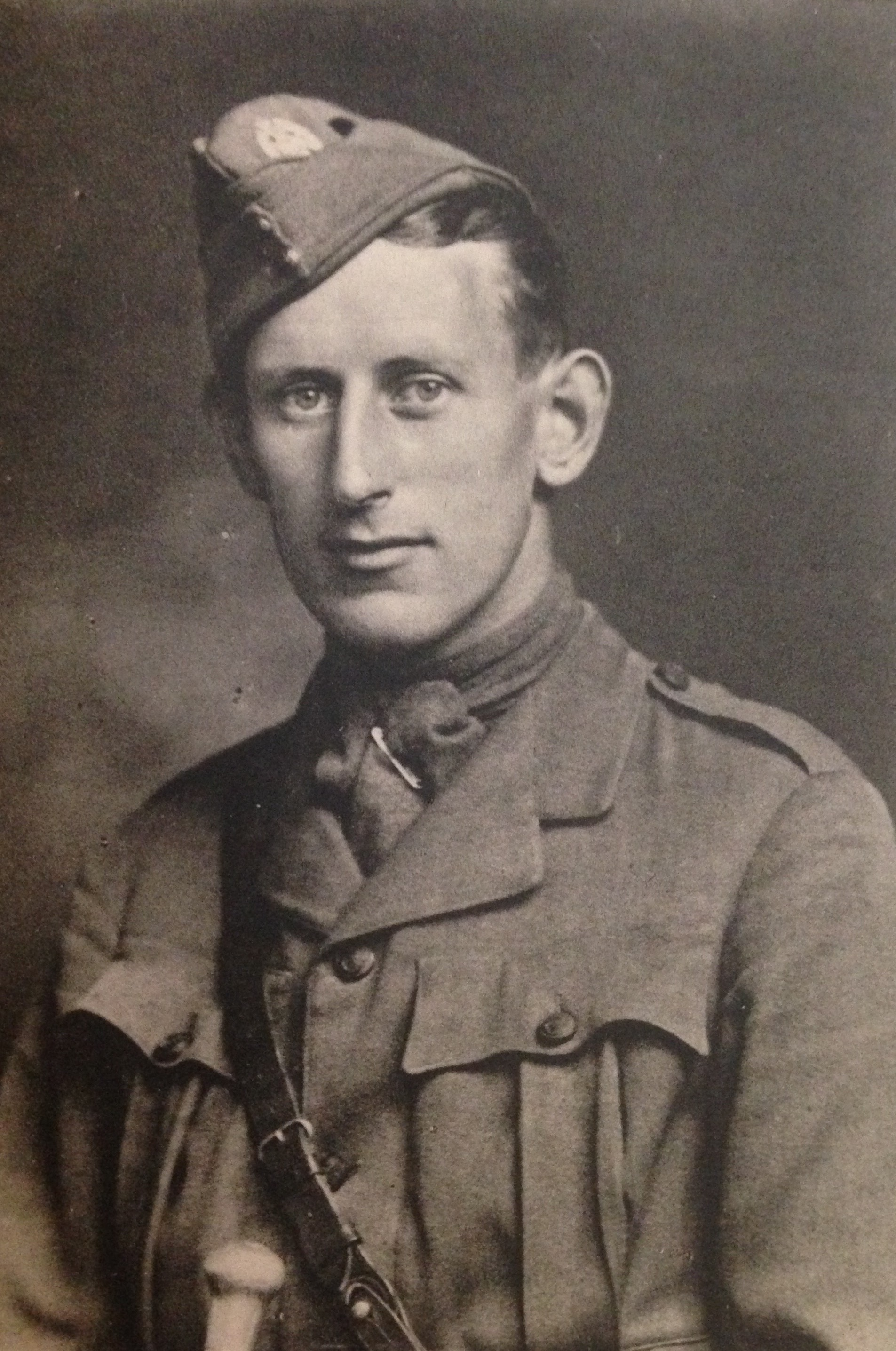
- Born: 23 September 1892 Edinburgh, Scotland
- Died: 22 August 1915 (aged 22) near Lille, France
- School: Edinburgh Academy
- University: King's College, Cambridge

Rugby union career
- Position: Fullback
Amateur team(s)
Years	Team	Apps	(Points)
1912–1914	Cambridge University RFC		
International career
Years	Team	Apps	(Points)
1913–1914	Scotland	4	(0)
- Military career
- Burial place: Cabaret-Rouge British Cemetery (XII. D. 11); 50.380885°N 2.741614°E
- Allegiance: United Kingdom
- Branch: British Army
- Service years: 1914–1915
- Rank: Lieutenant
- Units: 5th Rifle Brigade, attached No. 2 Squadron RFC
- Conflicts: First World War †: First Battle of the Aisne

William "Willie" Middleton Wallace (23 September 1892 – 22 August 1915) was a rugby union player. He played fullback for Cambridge University RFC and was capped for Scotland in 1913–14.

Having grown up in Edinburgh, Willie Wallace went to King's College, Cambridge in 1912, where he was immediately noticed for his rugby-playing ability. He was selected to play against Oxford in the Varsity Match in his first term. Later in the season, in March 1913, Scotland picked him to play away against England, in a close game, which England won by just three points. The following season he played in all three Home Nations matches against Wales, Ireland and England.

He was commissioned second lieutenant in The Rifle Brigade (Prince Consort's Own) at the start of the First World War and departed for the Western Front a few weeks later. In February 1915, he was attached to the Royal Flying Corps and soon became No. 2 Squadron's senior observer. In August 1915, while on a photographic reconnaissance mission, his aircraft was shot down in northern France, near Lille. At the time of his death, it was suggested that he might have been the first undergraduate to see action in the war.

== Early life ==
Wallace was born in Edinburgh, the son of Robert and Mary Wallace, on 23 September 1892. He went to school at Edinburgh Academy from 1899 to 1912 then studied at King's College, Cambridge until 15 July 1914. At school, he was in the rugby team for his final three years and vice-captain in the final year. He also played cricket, captaining the school team in 1911, as wicket-keeper.

== Rugby career ==
According to the rugby journalist and author E. H. D. Sewell, Wallace was the best fullback in the United Kingdom between 1912 and 1914. On arriving at Cambridge in 1912, his performance in the freshers' rugby match earned him his place on the Cambridge XV to play Oxford in the Varsity Match.

He was selected to play for Scotland against England in 1913; and Wales, Ireland, and England in 1914.

Scotland's first Five Nations Championship match of 1914 was on 7 February, played away to Wales at Cardiff. Scotland had not won in Cardiff since 1890 and Wales were favourites, having 'lost so unluckily' against England. The match pitted Welsh forward strength against the swift threequarter line of the Scots. The first points came from a try for Scotland by W. A. Stewart, converted by Hamilton, giving the visitors a five-point lead after four minutes. These were the only points they scored. Wales then attacked repeatedly and Wallace was kept busy in defence. With a 7–5 lead at half time, the Welsh pressed their advantage and ended the game 24–5 winners.

In the country's final game before the outbreak of the First World War, on 21 March Scotland played host to an English team that had already defeated Wales and Ireland. The Scots, with the wind behind them, opened the scoring in the first half with a try but England equalised just before half time. After the break, England got up a lead of 6–16 and the visitors seemed certain to win. Scotland responded and closed the gap to one point. The English were then playing with fourteen men after Cherry Pillman's leg was broken in a tackle, since substitutions at the time were not allowed. They managed to hold on, beating Scotland 15–16, thereby winning both the Triple Crown and the Calcutta Cup, as well as the Five Nations. It was England's last international test on British soil before the First World War: of the 30 players in the match, 11 went on to be killed in it, including the Englishman Arthur James Dingle, who died the same day as Wallace.

=== International appearances ===
Opposition	Score	Result	Date	Venue	Ref(s)
England	3–0	Lost	15 March 1913	Twickenham, England	
Wales	24–5	Lost	7 February 1914	Cardiff, Wales	
Ireland	6–0	Lost	28 February 1914	Lansdowne Road, Dublin, Ireland	
England	15–16	Lost	21 March 1914	Inverleith, Scotland	

== Military service and death ==
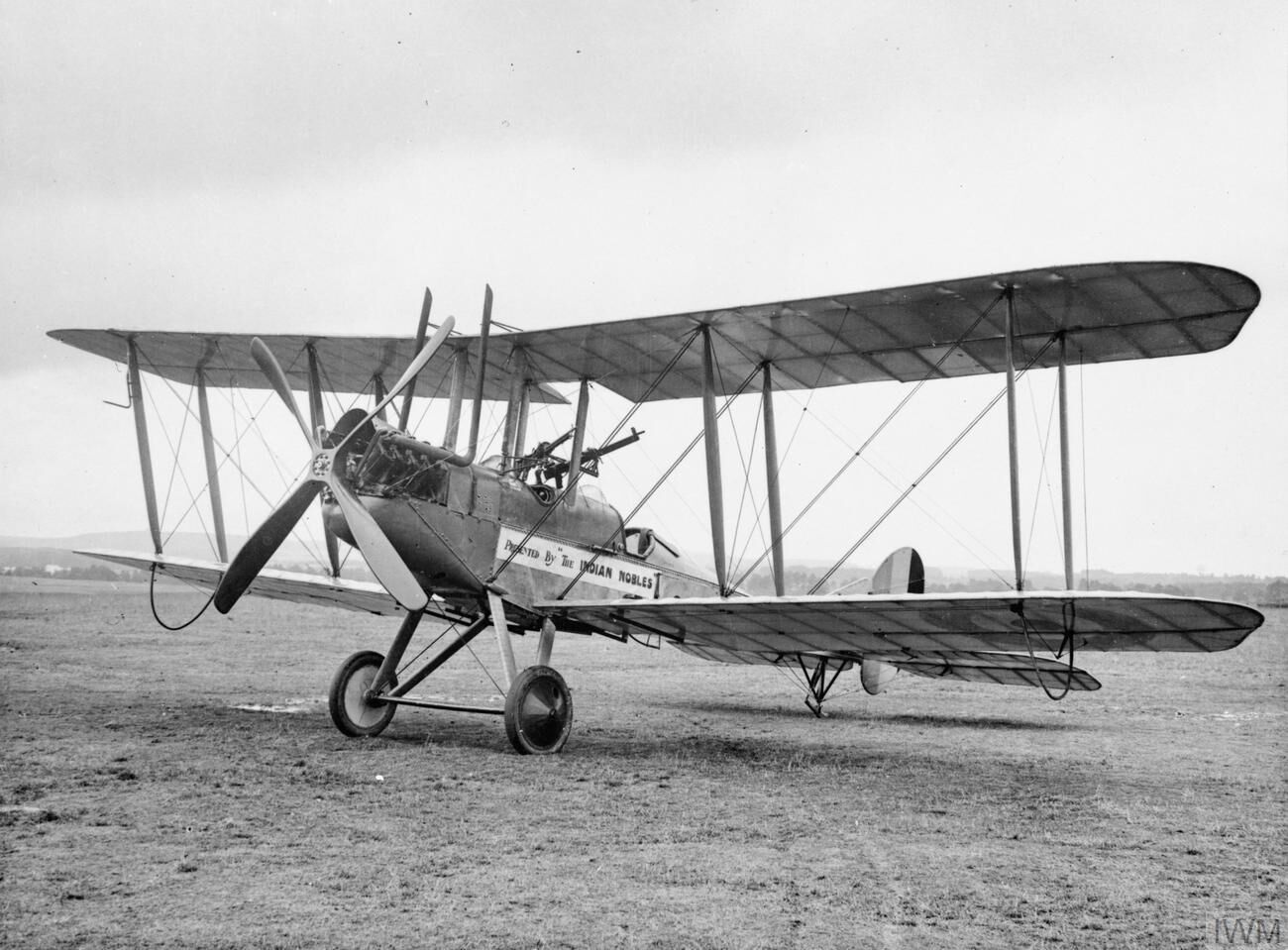
A RAF B.E.2c of the type which Gallie and Wallace were flying when shot down in August 1915

Wallace, who was a cadet of the Officers Training Corps, was commissioned second lieutenant in the 5th Battalion, The Rifle Brigade (Prince Consort's Own) on 5 August 1914, while still an undergraduate. There were suggestions at the time that he was the first undergraduate to go into action but they were not substantiated. After two weeks' training at Sheppey, he departed for France on 30 August. There, he participated in the First Battle of the Aisne and was active on the Western Front at Frelinghien and Ploegsteert Wood.

Wallace was attached to No. 2 Squadron, 1st Wing Royal Flying Corps (RFC) on 14 February 1915 as an observer, alongside William Barnard Rhodes-Moorhouse, the first serviceman of the RFC to be awarded the Victoria Cross. By July he was the squadron's senior observer and was made up to lieutenant on 21 July 1915. On 22 August 1915, Wallace was on a photographic reconnaissance mission in a B.E.2c piloted by his friend 2Lt Charles Gallie. The plane was hit by anti-aircraft fire and came straight down at Sainghin, near Lille, northern France.

Both men were buried near to where they fell, but after the war their bodies were reinterred at the Cabaret-Rouge British Cemetery (Grave reference XII. D. 11), Souchez, near Arras, France.

== Bibliography ==
- Collins, Tony (2009). A Social History of English Rugby Union. Routledge. ISBN 978-1-134-02335-6.
- Corsan, James (2009). For Poulton and England: The Life and Times of an Edwardian Rugby Hero. Leicester: Matador. ISBN 978-1-84876-210-7.
- McCrery, Nigel (2014). Into Touch: Rugby Internationals Killed in the Great War. Pen and Sword. ISBN 978-1-4738-3321-0.
- Sewell, Edward Humphrey Dalrymple (1919). The Rugby Football Internationals Roll of Honour. London, Edinburgh: T. C. & E. C. Jack.
