= Durham School =

Independent school in Durham, England

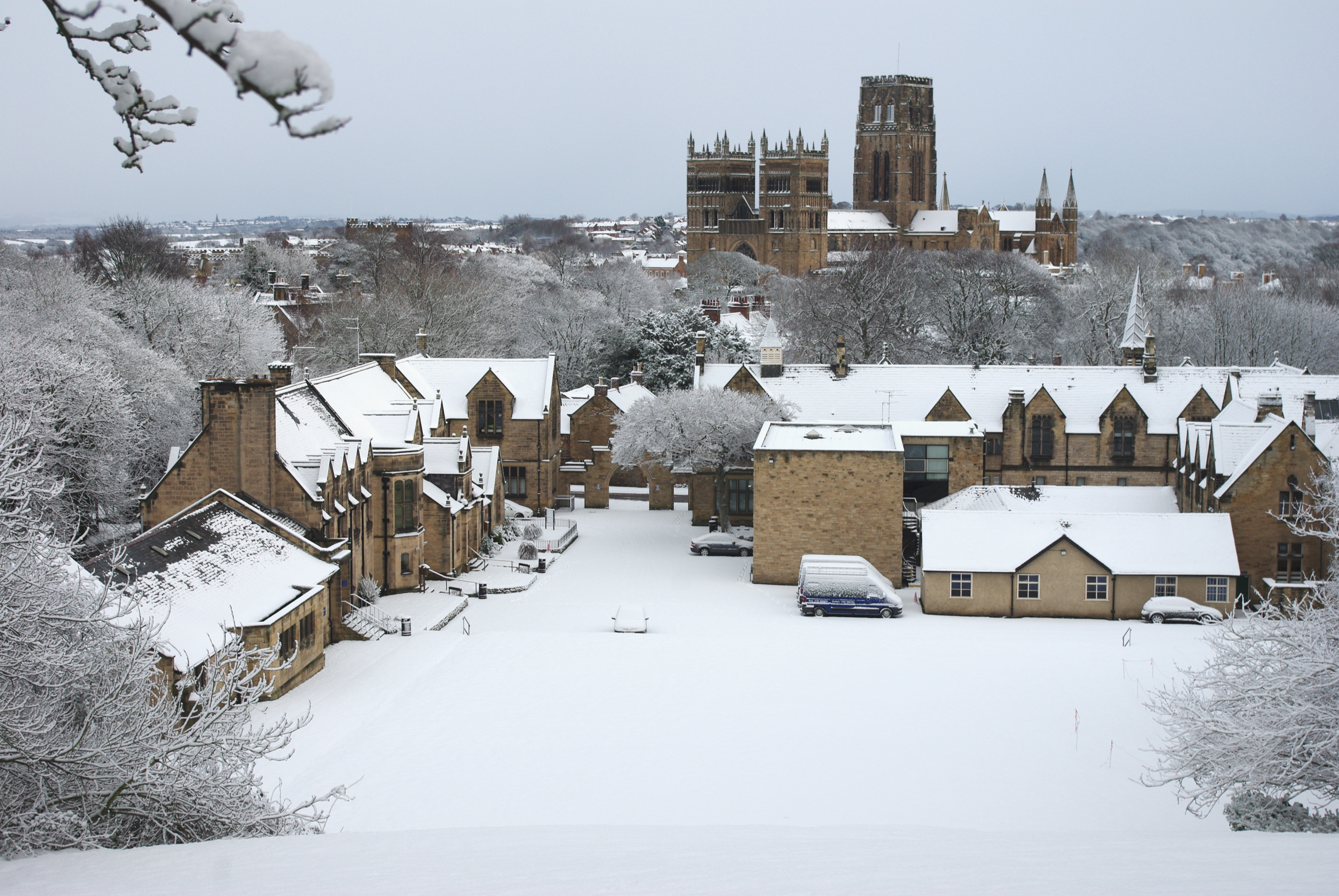

Location
- Quarryheads Lane; Durham, County Durham, DH1 4SZ; England; 54.771576°N 1.583024°W

Information
- Type: Public School; Private day and boarding school
- Motto: Latin: Floreat Dunelmia (Let Durham Flourish)
- Religious affiliation: Anglican
- Established: 1414; 612 years ago
- Founder: Thomas Langley
- Department for Education URN: 114331 Tables
- Chairman: Rob Ribchester
- Head Master: \Michael Alderson
- Gender: Co-educational
- Age: 3 to 18
- Enrolment: 526 (390 senior school, 136 Bow, Durham School) (January 2018)
- Houses: 6
- Colours: Green and silver
- Alumni: Old Dunelmians ("ODs")
- Website: durhamschool.co.uk

Durham School is a fee-charging boarding and day school in the English public school tradition located in Durham, North East England. Since 2021 it has been part of the Durham Cathedral Schools Foundation.

Durham School was an all-boys institution from its foundation in 1414 until 1985, when girls were admitted to the sixth form. The school takes pupils aged 3–18 years and became fully co-educational in 1998.

A member of the Headmasters' and Headmistresses' Conference, it enrolls 495 day and boarding students. Its preparatory institution, known as the Chorister School, enrolls a further 250 pupils.

Durham and Bow's former pupils include politicians, clergy and British aristocracy. Former students are known as Old Dunelmians. Founded by the Bishop of Durham, Thomas Langley, in 1414, it received royal foundation by King Henry VIII in 1541 following the Dissolution of the Monasteries during the Protestant Reformation. It is the city's oldest institution of learning.

== History ==
The history of Durham School can be divided into four sections. Firstly there is the time from its founding by Langley in 1414, then in 1541 Henry VIII refounded it, the period from 1844 when the school moved from its site on Palace Green to its current location across the river Wear, and finally from 2021 when the school became part of the Durham Cathedral Schools Foundation.

The school is often referred to in histories and the Oxford Dictionary of National Biography as "Durham Grammar School". It should not be confused with the Chorister School in Durham, which merged with Durham School in 2021 to form the Durham Cathedral Schools Foundation. There is some evidence of the existence of the school pre-1414: for example Simon of Farlington, an Archdeacon of Durham, gave the manor of Kyhou (Kyo) to the Almoner of Durham Cathedral Priory in 1180 "for the maintenance of 3 scholars of Durham School".

=== To 1541 ===
Durham School was founded by Thomas Langley in 1414, which was the foundation date accepted by the Clarendon Commission into public schools in 1861, making it the 18th oldest in Britain. In Langley's time the school was situated on the east side of Palace Green to the north of the cathedral.

=== 1541 to 1844 ===
At the time of the Dissolution of the Monasteries during the Protestant Reformation in 1541, the school was refounded by Henry VIII. It remained in the same location: indeed the Headmaster Henry Stafford remained in post during this period. In 1640 the "old School Buildings were utterly destroyed by the Scots, and the Head Master [Richard Smelt] retired to his Rectory of Easingwold where he took pupils" and the School was "recognised and endowed by the Parliamentary Commission 1652-3". Homeless due to the burning down of its buildings, the school continued in various houses in the city.

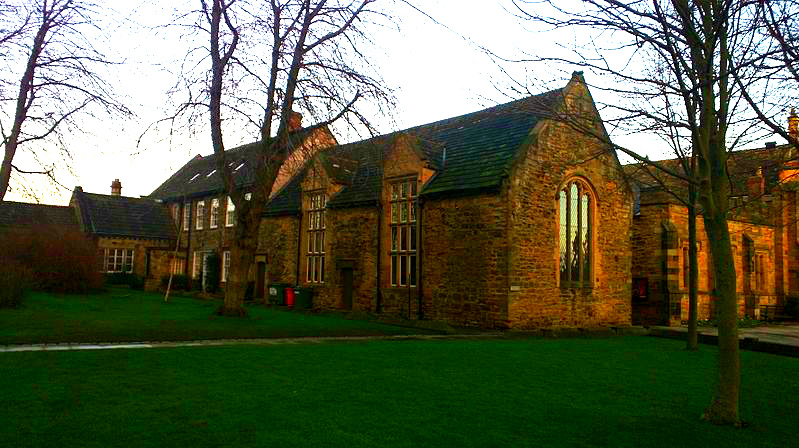
Building on Palace Green outside Durham Cathedral, the location of Durham School from 1661 to 1844.

In 1661, the school moved to the building currently occupied by the Durham University Department of Music to the south west of Palace Green.

There was some zeal for education in Durham during the 18th century. Durham School, rebuilt in 1661, on the Palace Green, soon became, instead of a local grammar school, a north-country public school of repute and wide influence. We can trace from the Restoration onwards not only the familiar city names such as Salvin, Wilkinson, Hutchinson, Blakiston, Fawcett, Bowes, Calverley, Cole. One of the chief distinctions of the school is the succession of local historians and antiquaries who drew their inspiration from the venerable association of the old school on the Green. Most famous of these is James Mickleton (1638–93), without whom no history of mediaeval or 17th-century Durham would be possible. Local history owes very much to Elias Smith, a notable head master (1640–66) who did his best to preserve the cathedral library through the Protectorate troubles, and to Thomas Rudd, head master (1691–9 and 1709–11), who indexed the Cathedral manuscripts. Later than these comes Thomas Randall (head master 1761–8), who made a large collection of manuscript material for local history books.

— William Page, The city of Durham - Introduction (3 of 3) 1928.

=== 1844 to 2021 ===
From its location on Palace Green outside Durham Cathedral, whilst Edward Elder was Headmaster the school moved to its present site in 1844.

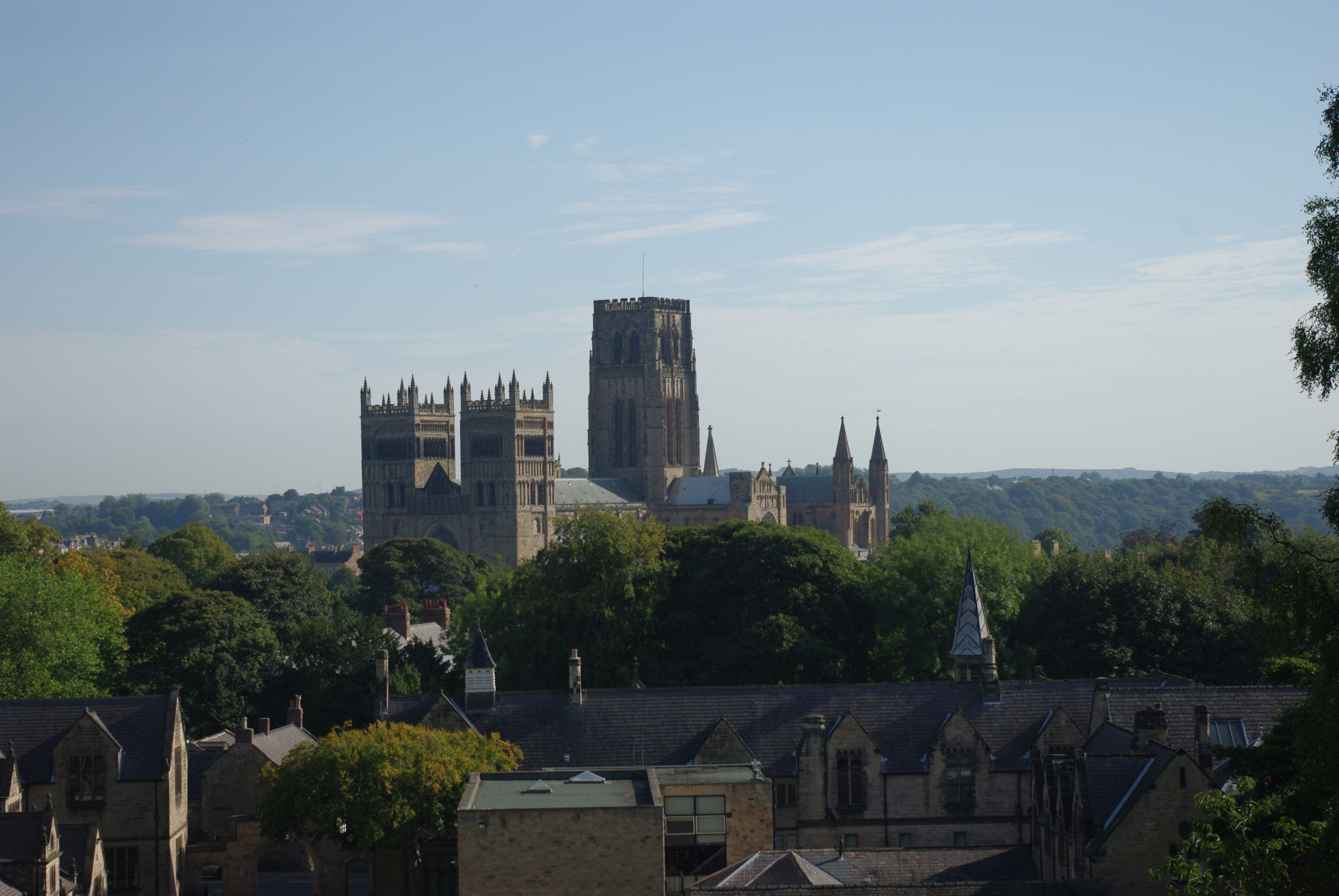
Durham Cathedral seen from outside the chapel

The school has been expanded and updated since then. For example:

Henry Holden, Headmaster 1853 to 1882, instigated new classrooms, dormitories, kitchens, sickroom then a sanatorium, bell tower and library.

William Fearon, Headmaster 1882 to 1884, introduced the three-term system used today and enlarged the playing fields and built an open air swimming pool. He was also responsible, in 1882, for the concrete path alongside the River Wear between Hatfield College Boat House and Elvet Bridge.

Richard Budworth, headmaster 1907 to 1932, oversaw expansion of the school. During his tenure were added fives courts, a boarding house in the Grove (a building now used for administration), Langley House, the Chapel (referred to below), new playing fields and classrooms, Poole House, the indoor swimming pool, the armoury and rifle range and the Kerr Arch. This arch, Grade II listed, was erected as the front entrance to the School and is in memory of G.C. Kerr, Cambridge Rowing Blue, Scottish rugby international and first civilian governor of the Sudan.

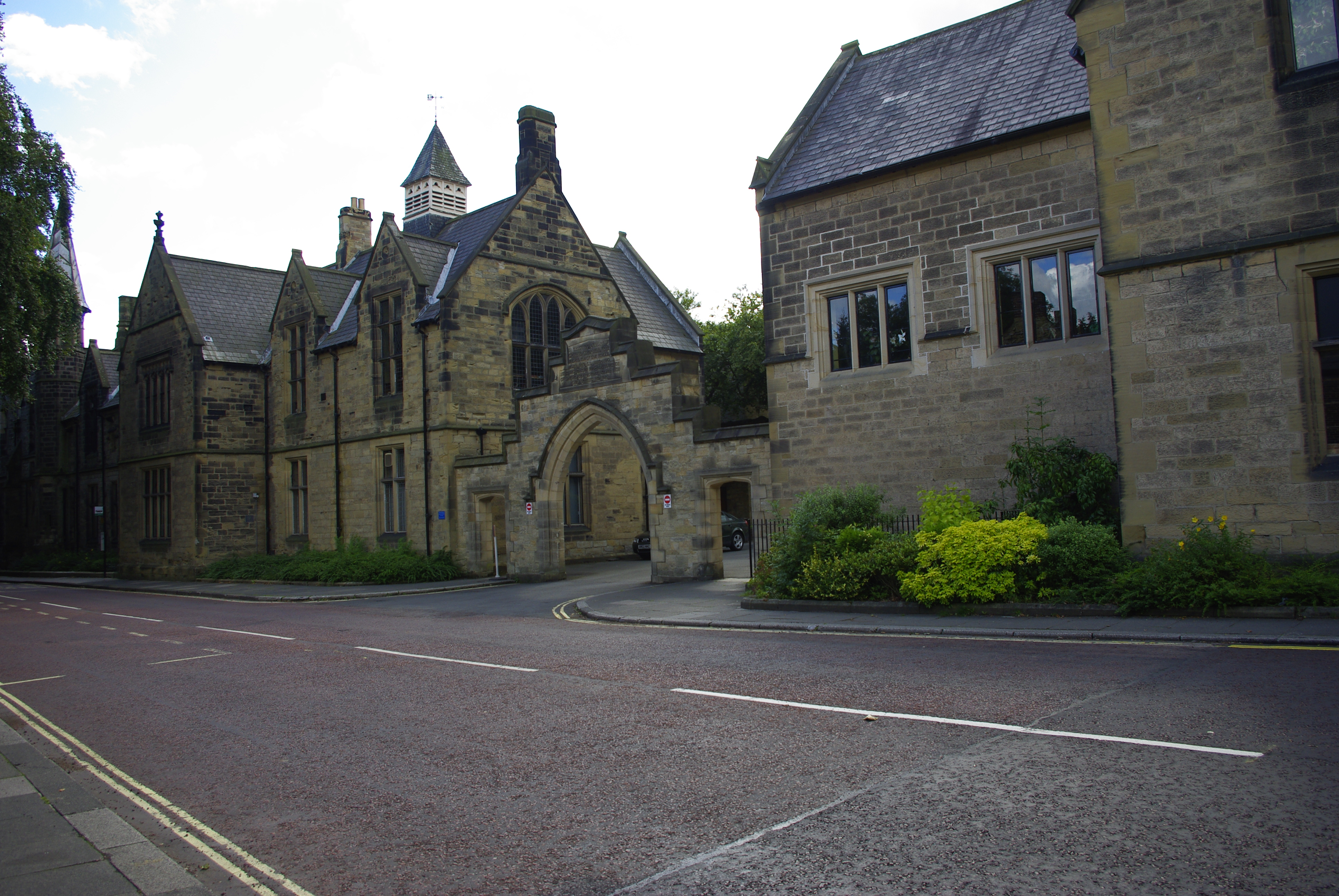
The front of Durham School taken from the road outside, illustrating the Kerr Arch in the centre.

John Brett, headmaster 1958 to 1967, oversaw the building of the cricket pavilion, new kitchens and laboratories and a sanatorium.

Michael Vallance, headmaster 1972 to 1982, opened a junior house of boys age 11 to 13 named Ferens House (this closed in 2003), but the main developments in his tenure were the Budworth sports centre and Luce Theatre. The sixth form became co-educational during this time.

With Neil Kern as headmaster, the principal developments included the introduction of girls throughout the school, making it fully co-educational, followed later by the creation of MacLeod House, and the all-weather sports pitch near the Chapel.

The school has been co-educational since 1985 and became independent from the Dean and Chapter of Durham Cathedral in 1996.

=== 2021 to date ===
Durham School merged with the Chorister School in 2021; though both schools kept their own names, the resultant Durham Cathedral Schools Foundation created a new overarching brand. The newly-merged school received an Independent Schools Inspectorate judgement of Excellent in 2023.

== School site ==
The school is located to the west of Durham Cathedral and across the River Wear from it. The campus consists of a range of buildings, some of them listed, and sports fields. The school has a boathouse located on the bank of the river, just downstream of Prebends Bridge.

=== Chapel and war memorial ===
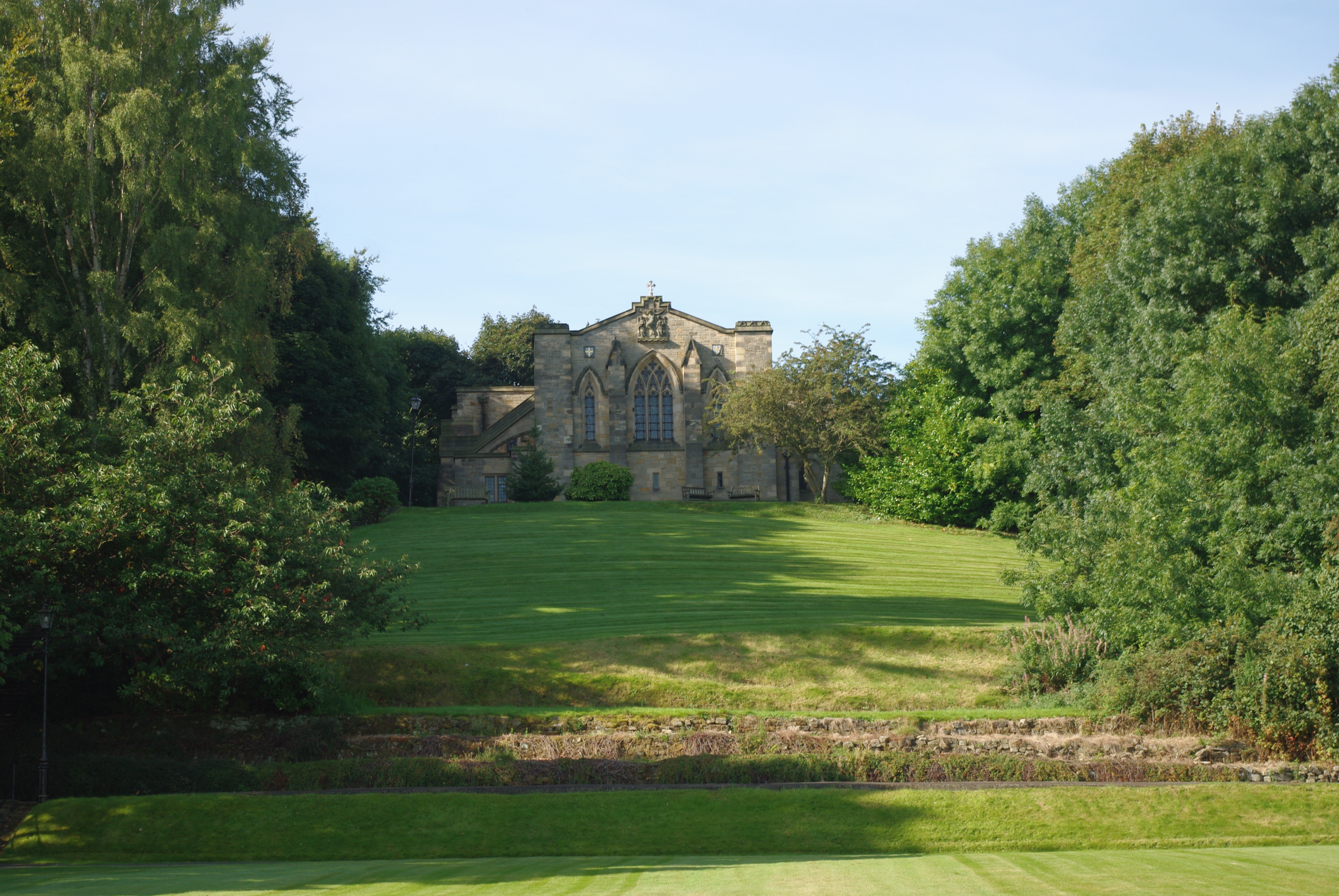
The chapel from the main school buildings

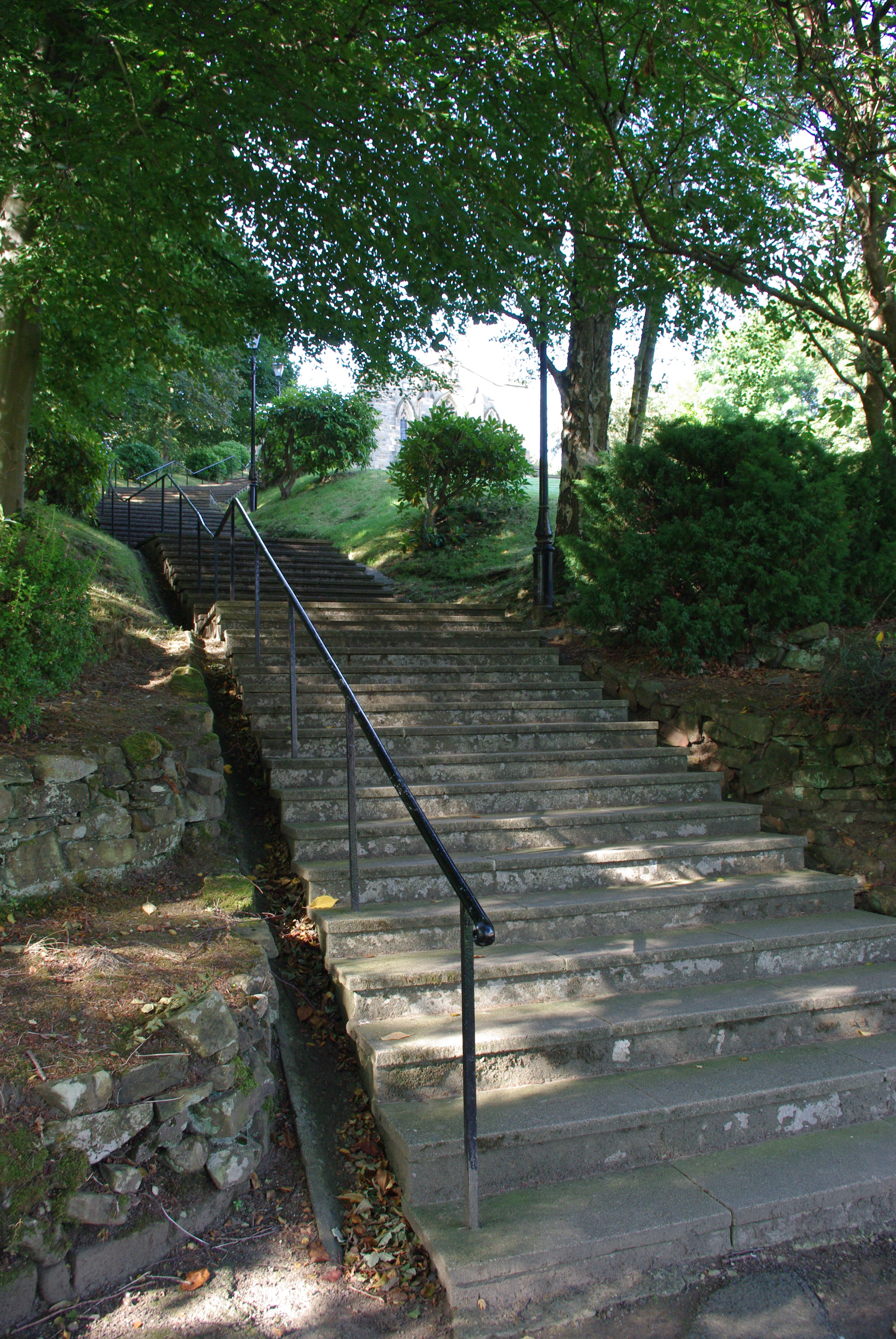
The chapel steps

The school chapel, built from 1924 to 1926 during the tenure of Richard Budworth as headmaster, sits on top of a hill overlooking the main school site.

The building is used for services three times a week, with the major service held on Friday afternoons, that the majority of pupils attend. The School is within the Anglican tradition.

The chapel is also the war memorial, its walls are engraved with the names of those who died in World War I and the further 79 who died in World War II. There are 97 steps to the chapel, one for each of the Old Dunelmians who died in World War I. (Note that the UKNIWM reference and Durham School's disagree on the number of World War I dead - 97 or 98.) The steps were re-laid in 1954.

A further war memorial, which predates the building of the chapel, can be seen in St Margaret's, the local Parish Church. It consists of a large brass panel listing the names of former pupils fallen in the First World War and is fixed on the south side of the Chancel arch, with the Parish memorial facing it on the north side.

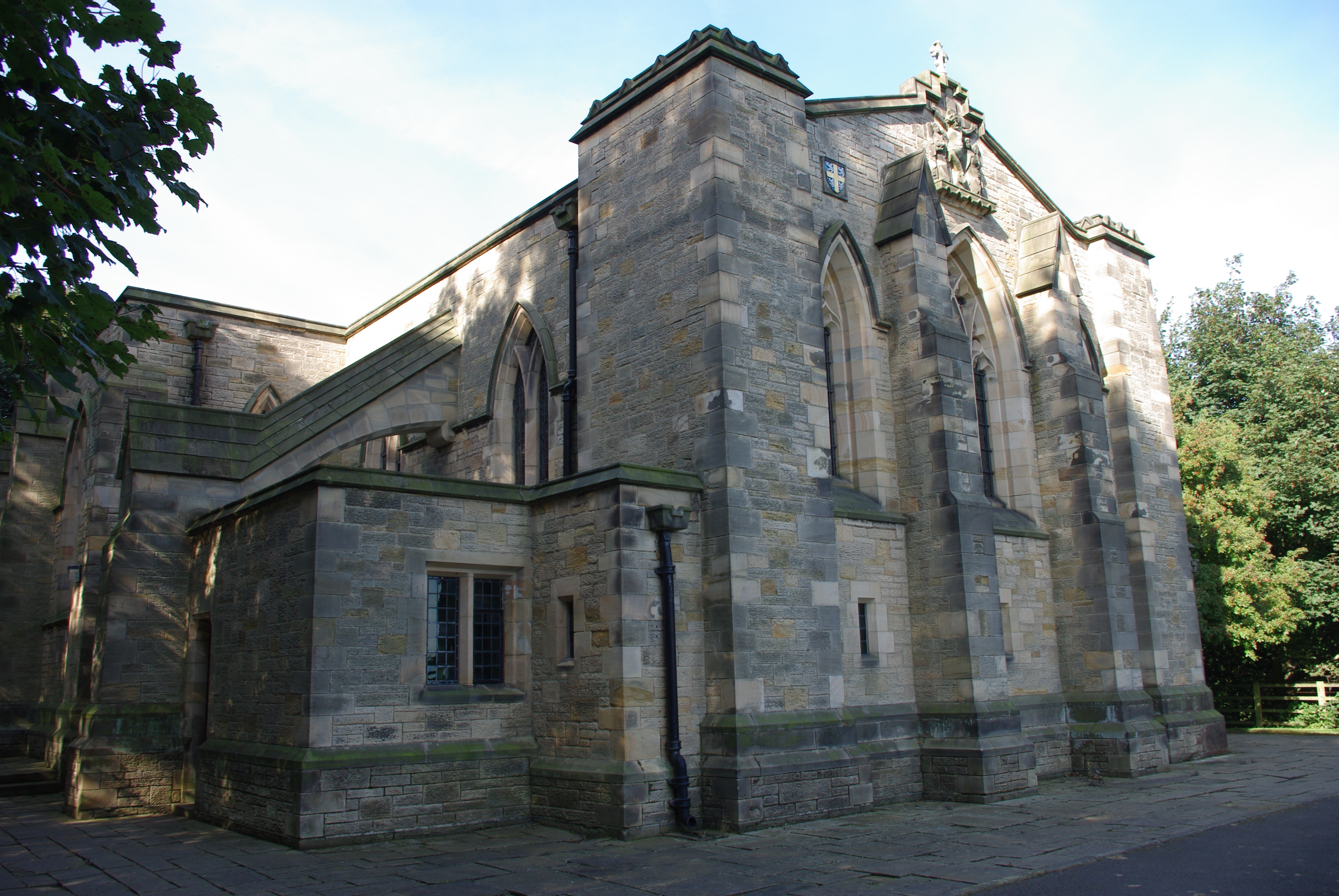
The chapel

== Academic subjects ==
=== A Level ===
The School offers a range of subjects at A Level: this varies from year to year as the needs of the students and the School change. Most students choose three subjects at A Level though some may study four or five.

=== GCSE ===
Durham School, in common with most other schools in England, offers a varied curriculum at GCSE where students study mathematics, English Language and Literature and science (either the individual physics, chemistry and biology or a double award science course). All students study a core modern foreign language of either French, German or Spanish. There are then a number of options that the students can choose from.

=== Key Stage 3 (Years 7 to 9) ===
Durham School offers a range of subjects to students in Years 7 to 9 that lead into the GCSE programme starting, generally, in Year 10, with the exception of those in set 1 maths, who do their maths GCSE a year early. They start their course in Year 9.

== Pastoral care ==
Pastoral care at Durham School is based around the house system:

=== House system ===
Although lessons are co-educational and sport takes place generally in year groups, for pastoral and sporting competition purposes, the school is divided into six different single sex houses. Each student is assigned to a house at the start of his or her time in the school and will, usually, remain in that house for the whole of their school career. The houses are separate buildings each with its own character in which the students are able to use the facilities and do private study. Currently the houses comprise:

House	Occupants	Founded	House colour
School House	boys, boarding and day	1844	
The Caffinites	boys, day	1847	
Poole House	boys, boarding and day	1924	
Pimlico House	girls, boarding and day	1985	
MacLeod House	girls, day	2005	
Lodge House	girls, day	2024	

School House boys are often nicknamed Bungites after the Headmaster Henry Holden who was also their Housemaster and himself nicknamed 'Bung' due to his ability to tell tall tales.

The Caffinites was also called The Second Masters House until it was renamed in 1924.

== Co-curricular ==
=== Sport ===
With facilities that encompass playing fields, swimming pool, all-weather pitch and boathouse, Durham School has a wide-ranging sports programme that includes athletics, badminton, cricket, cross country, fencing, football, gym, hockey, netball, rounders, rowing, rugby, squash, swimming, tennis, golf and water polo.

==== Cricket ====
Along with rowing, cricket is the major boys sport for the summer term. The school considers cricket to be one of its high-profile sports, with the 1st XI competing against a number of high-profile teams such as the MCC. The cricket pavilion was built in 1960.

==== Hockey ====
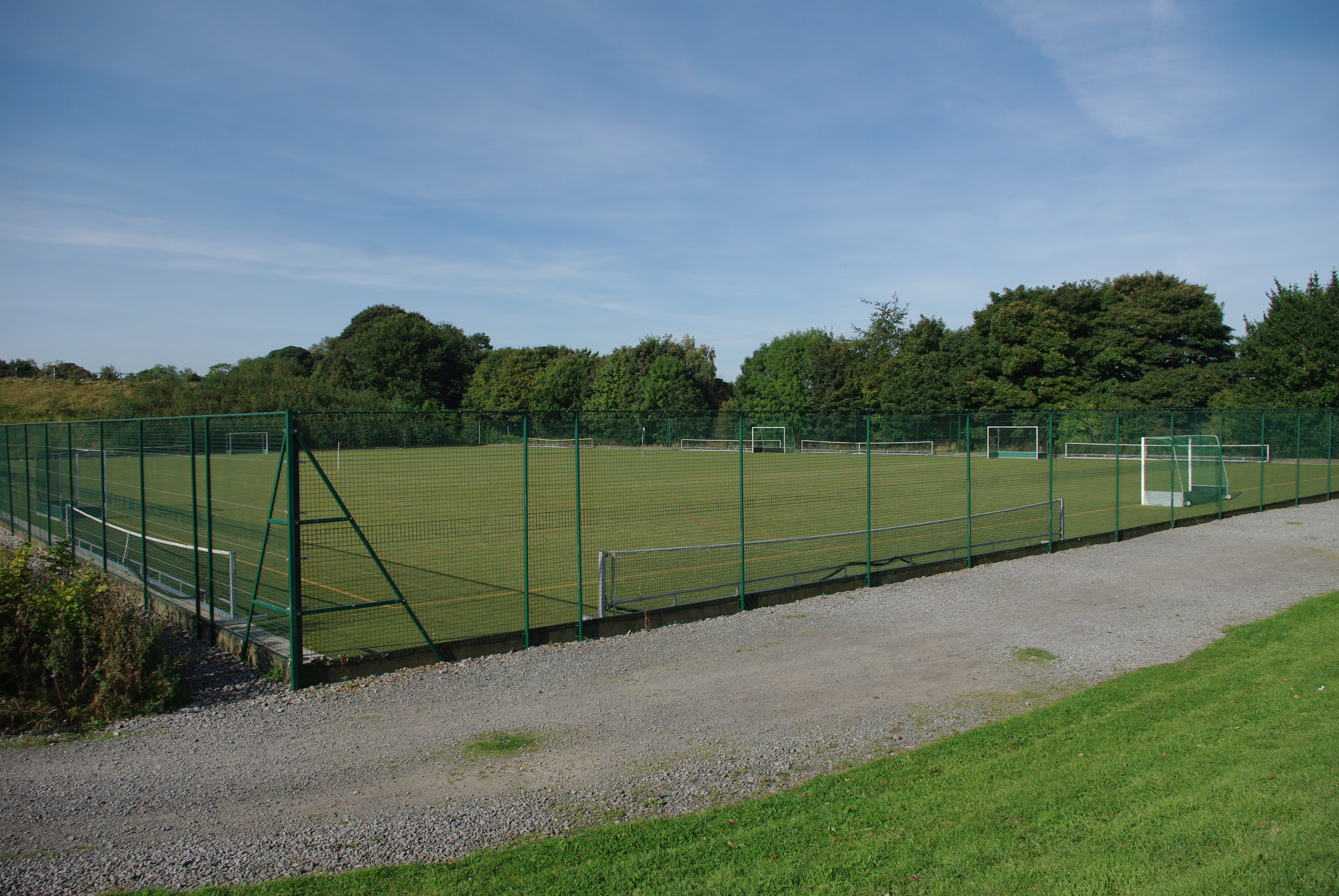
The all-weather pitch

The main sport for girls in winter is hockey. Each year a number of girls represent the county. Hockey is also played by the boys, predominantly in the Easter term.

==== Rowing ====
Rowing has been a major sport at Durham School since at least 1838. The Club aims to provide rowing opportunities to any who wish to be involved - "All year groups at the school have the opportunity to row at the appropriate level for their physiological and physical development" - and also wins at regattas and head races at home and abroad.

==== Rugby ====
The School has a number of playing fields, used predominantly for Rugby. The largest of these, Top Ground, was acquired in 1918. This has required work on its drainage over the years, 1921 and 1925 and again in 2009.

Durham School Football Club was founded in 1850 and was from 1890 to 1930 one of the rugby nurseries in England - this was first recognised by the Barbarians who honoured the school by playing a full side against the Old Dunelmians in 1897 (Barbarians won 18–5). Just before the First World War the school supplied four England players as well as a number of England triallists. Between 1920 and 1930 the school produced seven full internationals as well as several triallists (England, Scotland and British Lions). The headmaster during this great period was Richard Thomas Dutton Budworth who was himself a former England international and Barbarian. The history of the sport is celebrated in the annual Veterrimi IV Rugby Tournament.

Newcastle Falcons (originally Gosforth) rugby union club were founded as the old boys side and played in the school's colours of green and white hoops until 1996.

=== Combined Cadet Force ===
The Combined Cadet Force (CCF) is a Ministry of Defence sponsored youth organisation within schools in the UK. Durham School CCF has been running since it was formed as the Officer Training Corps (OTC) in 1914. The CCF is based in the Armoury and Range (previously there had been an air rifle range set up in the School House lavatories in 1906) built in 1926 and 1929 respectively. Currently the CCF is a voluntary activity that students may opt into from Year 9 onwards consisting of three sections, The Royal Navy, The Army and The Royal Air Force.

=== Music ===
Teaching and performance of music at the school takes place in the Grade II listed music school.

=== Drama ===
Teaching and performance of drama at the school takes place at the Luce Theatre, which is Grade II listed.

== Bow, Durham School ==
Bow, Durham School

Location
- South Road; Durham, County Durham, DH1 3LS; England

Information
- Type: Private school, preparatory school
- Religious affiliation: Anglican
- Established: 1885; 141 years ago
- Head Mistress: Sally Harrod
- Gender: Co-educational
- Age: 3 to 11
- Enrolment: 136 (January 2018)
- Website: durhamschool.co.uk/prep-school.asp

Bow, Durham School is the Durham School preparatory institution for pupils between the ages of 3 and 11 years. Founded in 1885 as Bow School, it was an all-male institution until becoming co-educational in 2006. The campus is situated one-half mile to the east of the senior school, overlooking the World Heritage Site, Durham Cathedral. Former pupils are known as ’Old Bowites’ and several prominent alumni include British politicians and members of the aristocracy, such as William Fletcher-Vane, 1st Baron Inglewood, Sir Brian Horrocks and Sir Gilbert Longden, and a number of professional sportsmen, such as Michael Philip Weston.

=== Notable headmasters ===
- 1894–1899: Walter Hobhouse
- 1907–1932: Richard Budworth

== Notable past pupils: Old Dunelmians ==
The past pupils of Durham School, referred to as Old Dunelmians, have been, and continue to be, found across the spectrum of public life, the armed services, the arts, the church and in sport. "Dunelmian" is derived from Dunelmensis, the Latin adjective of Durham. Their number include:

- Alexander Armstrong, actor, comedian, and singer, best known for hosting the BBC gameshow Pointless
- John Laws (judge), (1945–2020) Lord Justice Laws, High Court Judge between 1992 and 1999, when he came to the Court of Appeal
- Michael Gough, the actor best known for playing "Alfred" in the first four of the modern Batman films and comedian
- Field Marshal Henry Hardinge, 1st Viscount Hardinge, commander in chief of the British Army after The Duke of Wellington
- Anthony Salvin (1799–1881), architect
- Christopher Smart, poet, (1722–1771)
- Granville Sharp, founder of Sierra Leone
- Geoff Parling, Premiership and International Rugby Player (Leicester Tigers, England, British and Irish Lions)
- Lieutenant-General Sir Brian Horrocks, British Army general who saw service in both World War I and World War II
- Edward Shortt, British politician, Home Secretary (1919–1922)
- William Greenwell, Church of England priest and archaeologist

== See also ==
- List of the oldest schools in the United Kingdom
