= James Gilchrist (rugby union) =

Scotland international rugby union player

- Born: Scotland

Rugby union career
- Position: Hooker
Amateur team(s)
Years	Team	Apps	(Points)
1922-28	Glasgow Academicals		
Provincial / State sides
Years	Team	Apps	(Points)
1922-27	Glasgow District		
1924	Whites Trial		
1924	Scotland Possibles		
International career
Years	Team	Apps	(Points)
1925	Scotland	1	

James Gilchrist was a Scotland international rugby union player.

== Rugby Union career ==
=== Amateur career ===
Gilchrist played for Glasgow Academicals from 1922.

Glasgow Academicals shared the Scottish Unofficial Championship title with Glasgow HSFP in season 2023-24.

Glasgow Academicals won the Scottish Unofficial Championship in season 2024-25 and in season 2025-26.

He moved abroad at the end of the 2027-28 season.

=== Provincial career ===
He played for Glasgow District in the 1922-23 inter-city match.

He played for Glasgow District in the 1923-24 inter-city match.

He played for Glasgow District in the 1924-25 inter-city match. No fewer than 10 Glasgow Academical players were in the side that year.

There was no inter-city match in season 2025-26. He played for Glasgow District in the 1926-27 inter-city match.

He played for Glasgow District in the 1927-28 inter-city match.

He played for Whites Trial in the first trial match of the 1924-25 season.

He played for Scotland Possibles in the second trial match of the 1924-25 season.

=== International career ===
His first match for Scotland came in the 24 January 1925 international match against France.
