= Robert Millar (rugby union) =

Scottish rugby union player

- Born: Robert Kirkpatrick Millar; 29 June 1901 Edinburgh, Scotland
- Died: 17 April 1981 (aged 79) Orton, Moray, Scotland

Rugby union career
- Position: Wing
Amateur team(s)
| Years | Team | Apps | (Points) |
| 1922-25 | Army Rugby Union | | |
- London Scottish
Provincial / State sides
| Years | Team | Apps | (Points) |
| 1923-33 | Kent | | |
| 1924 | Scotland Possibles | | |
| 1924 | London Counties | 1 | (6) |
International career
| Years | Team | Apps | (Points) |
| 1924 | Scotland | 1 | (0) |

Robert Millar (29 June 1901 – 17 April 1981) was a Scotland international rugby union player.

== Rugby Union career ==
=== Amateur career ===
He was educated at Edinburgh Academy, but was commissioned from there into the army.

He played for the Army Rugby Union from 1922. He scored 4 tries in a match against Royal Navy Rugby Union in 1924. The Daily News of 3 March 1924 noting:

the outstanding feature of their attack was the dashing work of R. K. Millar, whose personal record of four tries on the wing will no doubt commend itself to the consideration of the Scottish selectors, who were not altogether impressed by his International debut against Ireland the previous week.

He played for London Scottish.

=== Provincial career ===
He played for Kent, while playing for London Scottish.

He was played for Scotland Possibles in their trial match of 19 January 1924 against Scotland Probables. Few Possibles players impressed, the Probables side winning by 33 points to zero.

He played for London Counties in their match against the All Blacks on 15 November 1924. Although London were beaten 31 points to 6, it was Millar that scored London's two tries and only points.

He played for the Possibles side again in the trial match the following season on 27 December 1924. Again the Probables convincingly won the match by 27 points to 3.

=== International career ===
He was capped just the once for Scotland, in 1924.

== Military career ==
He was a commissioned in the Royal Engineers in 1921, as a captain. He went through the ranks and was finally made a Major-General.

He served in India and China with the engineers from 1925 to 1933. In World War Two, he was awarded the DSO.

== Other interests ==
After the Second World War, he become an engineer in Pakistan. He was made a Companion to the Order of the Bath in 1954. He was made Deputy Lord Lieutenant of Moray in 1959.

== Family ==
His father was John Hepburn Millar, his mother was Margaret Williamina Tod. He married Frances Rhodes Beyts (1903-1999). He was survived by his wife and two sons Peter and Sandy on his death in 1981, at his home in Darnethills in Orton, Moray.
