= Arthur Laing (rugby union) =

Scotland international rugby union player (1892–1927)

- Born: Arthur Douglas Laing; 25 April 1892
- Died: 24 November 1927 (aged 35) Edinburgh, Scotland

Rugby union career
- Position: Lock
Amateur team(s)
Years	Team	Apps	(Points)
1909-	Royal HSFP		
1919	Army Rugby Union		
Provincial / State sides
Years	Team	Apps	(Points)
1921	Edinburgh District		
1913	Blues Trial		
-	Provinces District		
–	Cities District		
–	Scotland Probables		
International career
Years	Team	Apps	(Points)
1914-21	Scotland	7	(4)

Arthur Laing (25 April 1892 – 24 November 1927) was a Scotland international rugby union player.

== Rugby Union career ==
=== Amateur career ===
He went to the Royal High School of Edinburgh. He played rugby union and cricket for the school.

He played for Royal HSFP, and captained the side for a time; he played for the side before and after the Great War.

He played for the Army Rugby Union and competed in the Inter-Services tournament of 1919.

=== Provincial career ===
He played for Provinces District in their match against Anglo-Scots on 25 December 1913.

He played for Blues Trial against Whites Trial in their December 1913 match.

He played for Edinburgh District against Glasgow District in the 1920 inter-city match.

He played for Cities District on 11 December 1920.

He played for Scotland Probables on 10 January 1920 and on 8 January 1921 against Scotland Possibles.

=== International career ===
He played for Scotland 7 times in the period 1914 - 1921.

== Military career ==
He joined the 4th Royal Scots Guards (Lothian Regiment), firstly as a private, but was then commissioned as a 2nd Lieutenant on 1915; and was acting captain for a time.

He moved to the South Staffordshire Regiment. He saw service in France; and was wounded in battle at Lens. He was mentioned in despatches.

== Business career ==
Arthur became a brewer, along with his brother Herbert.

== Family ==
His father Hector Laing (1862-1927) was a fish merchant. His mother was Agnes Yule.

They had 3 sons: Hector Stanley Laing (1890-1955), Herbert Laing, and Arthur.

Arthur Laing married Mary Cameron Stark (1891-1970) on 28 May 1918 at the Court House in Edinburgh.

== Death ==
After his playing career ended he became a fan of the Royal HSFP side. A week before he died he watched his side play Kelvinside Academicals. The Scotsman newspaper of 26 November 1927 concluding: "It was there he probably got the chill that developed early in the week into pneumonia."

He died in a nursing home in Edinburgh.
