= William Ferguson (rugby union) =

Scotland international rugby union player

- Born: William G. Ferguson Scotland

Rugby union career
- Position: Prop
Amateur team(s)
Years	Team	Apps	(Points)
1927-28	Royal HSFP		
Provincial / State sides
Years	Team	Apps	(Points)
1927-28	Edinburgh District		
International career
Years	Team	Apps	(Points)
1927-28	Scotland		

William Ferguson was a Scotland international rugby union player.

== Rugby Union career ==
=== Amateur career ===
Ferguson played for Royal HSFP.

=== Provincial career ===
He played for Edinburgh District in the 1927 inter-city match.

He played for Edinburgh District in the 1928 inter-city match.

=== International career ===
His first match for Scotland came in the 17 December 1927 international match against Australia.

He played in Scotland's match against England at Twickenham on 17 March 1928. Ferguson sustained a leg injury in the match, and without replacements at the time, England won the match by two tries to nil.
