= Tom McGlashan =

Scotland international rugby union player

- Born: Thomas Perry Lang McGlashan; 29 December 1925 Edinburgh, Scotland
- Died: 17 September 2020 (aged 94) Gullane, Scotland

Rugby union career
- Position: Prop
Amateur team(s)
Years	Team	Apps	(Points)
1942-64	Royal HSFP	249	
- Co-Optimists
Provincial / State sides
Years	Team	Apps	(Points)
1946	Edinburgh District		
1946	Whites Trial		
1947	Scotland Probables		
1947	Cities District		
International career
Years	Team	Apps	(Points)
1947-54	Scotland	8	(0)
1947	Barbarians		

Tom McGlashan (29 December 1925 – 17 September 2020) was a Scotland international rugby union player.

== Rugby Union career ==
=== Amateur career ===
He played for Royal HSFP. During his time at the club they came second in the Scottish Unofficial Championship in 1951–52 season; and won the Jed-Forest Sevens in 1947. He won the Langholm Sevens in 1949.

He also played for the Co-Optimists.

=== Provincial career ===
He was capped for Edinburgh District in the 1946 inter-city match against Glasgow District.

He played for Whites Trial in their match against Blues Trial on 21 December 1946.

He graduated to play for the Scotland Probables in the final trial match on 18 January 1947.

He played for Cities District in their match against Australia on 15 October 1947.

=== International career ===
He was capped eight times for Scotland between 1947 and 1954.

He also represented the Barbarians.

=== Administrative career ===
He served three terms as President of Royal HSFP.

He was an Honorary President of the Co-Optimists.

== Boxing career ==
He obtained a boxing blue at Edinburgh University. He won the Scottish Universities heavyweight title in 1950.

== Athletics career ==
He was credited with a Scottish schools record in the Shot Putt. He was still on the Scottish rankings at age 34.

== Medical career ==
He became a dentist. However he was still involved in rugby union. He pioneered the use of gumshields for the players, and was Scottish Rugby's honorary dentist.

== Death ==
He died of Alzheimer's Disease at the Muirfield Nursing Home in Gullane. He donated his brain to the University of Glasgow in their research of head injury and dementia.
