= William Stevenson (rugby union) =

- Born: William Hugh Stevenson; 3 May 1897 Glasgow, Scotland
- Died: 26 August 1972 (aged 75) Streatley, Berkshire, England

Rugby union career
- Position: Prop
Amateur team(s)
Years	Team	Apps	(Points)
- Glasgow Academicals
Provincial / State sides
Years	Team	Apps	(Points)
1924	Glasgow District		
1924	Whites Trial		
1924	Scotland Possibles		
1924	Scotland Probables		
International career
Years	Team	Apps	(Points)
1925	Scotland	1	(0)

William Stevenson (3 May 1897 – 26 August 1972) was a Scotland international rugby union player.

== Rugby Union career ==
=== Amateur career ===
Stevenson played for Glasgow Academicals.

=== Provincial career ===
He played for Glasgow District in the 1924 inter-city match against Edinburgh District.

He played for Whites Trial against Blues Trial on 15 December 1924; and he started for Scotland Possibles in the trial match of 27 December 1924, impressing he came on for the Scotland Probables side in the second half.

=== International career ===
Stevenson played for Scotland once in 1925.

== Military career ==
He was in the 3/16 Punjab regiment, and was a captain.

== Family ==
His father Hugh Ferguson Stevenson (1845-1930) married Eliza McEwen (1854-1933) in 1879 in Glasgow.

William was one of their eight children, and the youngest son.

William was to marry Elizabeth Margaret Wallace (1902-1985) in 1931 in Kirkintilloch.
