= Russell Bruce =

Scotland international rugby union player

- Full name: Charles Russell Bruce
- Born: 25 April 1918
- Died: 17 April 2009 (aged 90) Glasgow, Scotland
- School: Glasgow Academy
- Occupation: Surveyor

Rugby union career
- Position: Centre / Fly-half
Amateur team(s)
Years	Team	Apps	(Points)
- Glasgow Academicals
1944	Army		
Provincial / State sides
Years	Team	Apps	(Points)
1946	Glasgow District		
1946	Blues Trial		
1947	Scotland Probables		
International career
Years	Team	Apps	(Points)
1947–49	Scotland	8	(0)

Charles Russell Bruce (25 April 1918 — 17 April 2009) was a Scotland international rugby union player.

== Rugby Union career ==
=== Amateur career ===
Bruce was educated at Glasgow Academy and played for Glasgow Academicals.

He played for the Army Rugby Union side in 1944.

=== Provincial career ===
He captained Glasgow District in the 1946 December inter-city match against Edinburgh District.

He later played in the trial match that month. He played for the Blues Trial side on 21 December 1946 against Whites Trial side.

He then turned out for the final trial match for Scotland Probables against Scotland Possibles on 18 January 1947.

=== International career ===
Bruce represented Scotland in the 1946 Victory Internationals which were at the time non-cap internationals, before later gaining official caps in the 1947 Five Nations. He featured in all four of Scotland's matches, the first three as a centre, then as an experimented fly-half for the final match against England, for which he also stood in as captain. For his remaining four caps, all in the 1949 Five Nations, he was used again at fly-half.

== Military career ==
He served as an Army major during World War 2.

== See also ==
- List of Scotland national rugby union players
