= John Anderson (rugby, born 1918) =

Scotland international rugby union player, also played rugby league

- Born: John Anderson; 1918 Hawick, Scotland
- Died: 31 July 2003 (aged 84) Hawick, Scotland

Rugby union career
- Position: Wing
Amateur team(s)
Years	Team	Apps	(Points)
- Hawick
- Army
- Combined Services
1945–46	London Scottish		
Provincial / State sides
Years	Team	Apps	(Points)
1945	Scotland Probables		
International career
Years	Team	Apps	(Points)
1946	Scotland	1	(0)
- Rugby league career

Playing information
- Position: Wing
Club
Years	Team	Pld	T	G	FG	P
1946–53	Huddersfield	114	74	21	0	264

John Anderson (1918–2003) was a Scotland international rugby union player. He later was signed by the Huddersfield to play rugby league.

== Rugby Union career ==
=== Amateur career ===
A native of Hawick, Anderson played for the Army and the Combined Services side during the Second World War. He later moved on to play for London Scottish.

=== Provincial career ===
He played for Scotland Probables against Scotland Possibles in the trial match of 15 December 1945.

=== International career ===
He was capped only once for Scotland on 19 January 1946. This was a non-cap match at the time but the SRU gave it full cap status in 2024.

Anderson played for Scotland against the All Blacks touring side, which at the time were designated a New Zealand Army side. The match against Scotland proved the All Blacks only defeat of their tour with Anderson scoring two tries in a 11 – 6 win.

== Rugby League career ==
=== Professional career ===
Not surprisingly, after scoring two tries against the All Blacks, the professional sides of England's Rugby League wanted to snap Anderson up in a move to the code of Rugby League. Leeds, Halifax, Oldham and Huddersfield all made moves to sign him.

Huddersfield won the race for his signature on 21 January 1946, only two days after his Scotland international match against the New Zealand Army. It was billed as 'the biggest capture in post-war history'. At Huddersfield, he was usually referred to by his nickname "Jock".

With Anderson in tow, Huddersfield reached that year's Championship final against Wigan on 18 May 1946; Wigan won the match 13 – 4.

Huddersfield did, however, win the 1948–49 Championship title with Anderson assisting in Huddersfield's last try of the final by Pat Devery. Huddersfield won the match and the title 13 – 12.

In 1953, Anderson brought his playing career to an end, and returned to Hawick.

== Athletics career ==
Anderson was a keen sprinter and ran in the Powderhall Sprint.

== Military career ==
On the start of World War 2, Anderson joined the Army. He was a Prisoner of War in German hands for 3 years. The POW camp was in Czechoslovakia.
