= Robert Henderson (rugby union, born 1900) =

British Lions & Scotland international rugby union player

Robert Gordon Henderson
- Born: Robert Gordon Henderson; 8 January 1900 Coldstream, Scotland
- Died: 24 February 1977 (aged 77) Surrey, England

Rugby union career
- Position: Prop
Amateur team(s)
Years	Team	Apps	(Points)
- Newcastle Northern
Provincial / State sides
Years	Team	Apps	(Points)
- Scotland Probables
International career
Years	Team	Apps	(Points)
1924	Scotland	2	(0)
1924	British and Irish Lions	2	(0)

Robert Henderson (8 January 1900 – 24 February 1977) was a Scotland international rugby union player.

== Rugby Union career ==
=== Amateur career ===
Henderson played for Newcastle Northern.

He retired from rugby union in September 1925. It was a re-occurrence of his knee injury that forced this decision.

=== Provincial career ===
He played for Scotland Probables against Scotland Possibles in the trial match of 22 December 1923. The Possibles won the match 10 - 6. He turned out again for the Probables in the later trial match of 19 January 1924.

=== International career ===
Henderson played for Scotland twice in 1924.

That same year he played for the British and Irish Lions on their tour to South Africa. It was on his tour that he injured his knee and that curtailed his playing career. He received electrical treatment to his knee in Johannesburg.

== Police career ==
He joined the Nigerian Police in 1929. In 1933 he was the Assistant Commissioner.

== Outside of rugby union ==
He was a keen golfer and played at the Gosforth Golf Club. He won the Silver Challenge Cleek, a trophy won for the best gross score, in 1923. He broke the course record in 1929 with a score of 33 out and 33 in for a total of 66. He made the Northumberland county team and was particularly noted for his long drives.

Both he and his wife were members of the Gullane Golf Club. In 1926, he broke the then Gullane record for course No. 1 with a score of 70; then followed that up with a round of 69 for course No. 2.

He played in the Scottish Amateur Golf Championship at Troon in 1939. He was beaten in the third round (the last 32 stage) by D. R. Young of Sandyhills by 1 hole. It was noted that he was the last player from the east coast left in the tournament.

While in Nigeria, he was one of the organisers of the Nigerian Amateur Athletic Association. In 1947 the association held the first Inter-Colonial sports meeting in west Africa.

== Family ==
His father was Dr. George Henderson of East Brae in Coldstream, his mother Isabella. They had a daughter Isobel and three other sons George, John and Francis

In 1933, Robert married Lottie Mary Falk. She was the daughter of Edward M. Falk, the senior resident of Nigeria Government Service.
