= Tom Aitchison =

Scotland international rugby union player

- Born: Thomas Graham Aitchison; 8 January 1907 Galashiels, Scotland
- Died: 25 December 1977 (aged 70) Clovenfords, Scotland

Rugby union career
- Position: Full Back / Centre
Amateur team(s)
Years	Team	Apps	(Points)
1932	Gala		
1932 -	West of Scotland		
Provincial / State sides
Years	Team	Apps	(Points)
- South of Scotland District
1928	Provinces		
1929	Scotland Probables		
International career
Years	Team	Apps	(Points)
1929	Scotland	3	(0)

Tom Aitchison (8 January 1907 – 25 December 1977) was a Scotland international rugby union player.

== Rugby Union career ==
=== Amateur career ===
Aitchison played for Gala. He was captain in the 1929–30 season. He was in the Gala side that won the Scottish Unofficial Championship in the 1931–32 season.

On moving to Glasgow he then played for West of Scotland.

=== Provincial career ===
He played for the South of Scotland District. He was in the side that drew with the South Africa international side on 31 October 1931.

Aitchison played for the Provinces District side (also known as the north–south side) on 22 December 1928.

He played for the Scotland Possibles side against the Scotland Probables side in the final trial match of the 1928-29 season to determine international selection.

=== International career ===
He played for Scotland 3 times, in the year 1929.

His first match was against Wales. The Dundee Courier reported his selection for the Scotland-Wales match:

The Scottish party arrived at Swansea yesterday afternoon, and later was announced that the full-back position vacated by Drysdale would be filled T. G. Aitchison, of Gala. This will be Aitchison's first international, and, while it would be ridiculous to suggest that he is in the same class as either Drysdale or Warren, I believe he will be quite a good selection. On his showing for the North and South against the Anglo-Scots on his own ground he was rather disappointing, but it is always an ordeal for a man to make his debut in really big football before his own people. In the final trial at Murrayfield he was a different man altogether, and on foreign soil where has nothing worry about except the job in hand he is quite likely to do well. He is not such long kick as either Drysdale or Warren, but he is a good field, and his tackling lacks nothing in courage.

He also played for the combined Scotland-Ireland side against the combined England-Wales side in October 1929.
