= Army Rugby Union =

(England) Army Rugby Union
- Founded: 1906
- Location: Army Rugby Stadium Queens Avenue, Aldershot, Hampshire
- Ground(s): The Army Rugby Stadium, Aldershot
- President: General Sir Roland Walker
- Coach: Major Wayne Burnard REME
- Most appearances: LCpl C Budgen ROYAL WELSH 39 caps
1st kit	2nd kit

Official website
- www.armyrugbyunion.org.uk

The Army Rugby Union (ARU) is the governing body for rugby union in the British Army and a constituent body of the Rugby Football Union (RFU). The ARU was formed on 31 December 1906 and marked the fulfilment of Lieutenant J. E. C. "Birdie" Partridge's (Welch Regiment) idea to have a body to administer the playing of rugby union in the British Army.

It fields a team that competes in the competitions, such as the Inter-Service Championship which includes the Army Navy Match.

== History ==
Since the game's earliest years, members of the army have been keen players, but it was not until the Crimean War (1854–56) that a record was made of a game being played. Thereafter regiments of the British Army played wherever they were stationed in the British Empire spreading its popularity around the globe. It was a result of the game being played in British India in the 1870s that led to the 3rd (East Kent) Regiment and the 62nd (Wiltshire) Regiment having a hand in the creation of the Calcutta Cup, the oldest international trophy. Many English rugby union clubs such as Leicester were also formed by soldiers.

The Army were represented in the very first international by two England players, Lieutenant Charles Arthur Crompton RE and Lieutenant Charles William Sherrard RE.

Shortly after the ARU was formed, the RFU donated the Army Cup, which was to be contested at inter-unit level. Several units built their rugby reputations in the competition, including the Duke of Wellington's Regiment, the Welch Regiment, the Royal Signals and 7 Regiment Royal Horse Artillery.

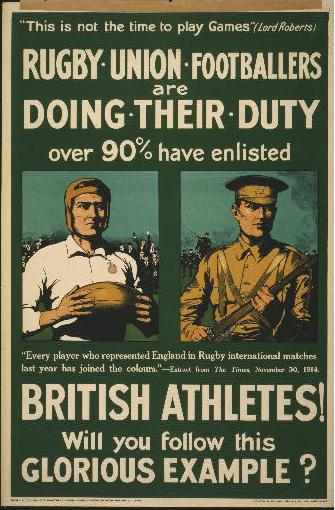
1915 British Army Recruiting Poster during The Great War

The highlight of the ARU season is the annual Army Navy Match held at Twickenham. The first of these matches took place in 1878 at the Kennington Oval, but it was not until 1907 that the match became an annual fixture as part of the Inter-Service Competition. In 1919, an Inter-Service Championship was arranged by the Army Rugby Union, which included Service teams from Australia, Canada, New Zealand and South Africa, as well as a Royal Air Force team and a British Army team playing under the name "Mother Country". The Mother Country and New Zealand Army reached the final at Twickenham, with New Zealand winning the encounter to lift the King's Cup. In 1920 the Army–Navy competition was expanded to include the Royal Air Force, the same year that CSM C. W. Jones (Welch Regiment) was to become the first "other rank" to be picked to represent the army.

Between the wars (1920–39) the ARU arranged matches against the French Army, the last of which was played shortly before the Nazi German invasion of France in 1940. The period also saw Army players being selected for British Lions teams. In 1931 the Army Rugby Union Referees Society (ARURS) was formed and continues to provide professional refereeing for all games.

Although the activities of the ARU were curtailed during the Second World War (1939–45), as they had been during the First World War (1914–18), a series of Service International matches were played around the country by teams drawn from rugby playing servicemen; these games drew large crowds and helped to maintain the nation's morale through the dark days of the war. An international team was formed shortly after the end of World War II, known as the British Empire Forces, who played a series of games against France. Although made up of internationals, with some from the professional code of rugby league, no caps were awarded to the Empire players in these matches, although the French Union recognised their players with caps.

After the war first class rugby union players brought in through National Service dominated army rugby. During the period 1948–62 more men played for the Army XV than in any other previous or subsequent era. It meant that thirty Army players were selected to represent their countries and from among those selected; Matthews, Hall, Cameron, Scotland, Mike Campbell-Lamerton and Fisher were given the added privilege of captaining their respective national teams. Also on a national front the ARU can boast of the fact that it has had appointed from its ranks Presidents for the English and Scottish RFUs. They were: Major General BA Hill CB, DSO (English RFU 1937–39), Colonel BC Hartley CB, OBE (English RFU 1947–48), Major General RGS Hobbs CB, DSO, OBE (English RFU 1961–62), Brigadier FH Coutts CBE, DL (Scottish RFU 1977–78), Brigadier DW Shuttleworth OBE, ADC (English RFU 1985–86)

A British Army Germany rugby union team regularly plays games against emerging nations like Belgium, Denmark, Netherlands, Germany and Luxembourg. In the last few years the operational tempo of Army units on British Army Germany have seen these fixtures reduced.

In September 2011 the Army Senior XV travelled to Australia to participate in the first ever International Defence Rugby World Cup. Teams from the UK (Royal Navy, Royal Air Force and Army), the French Defence Force, the Australian and New Zealand Defence Forces, Tonga, Samoa, China and Papua New Guinea all took part. The Army beat Samoa and the French Defence Force to progress to the semi-finals and were flown to Auckland New Zealand to play Tonga in the semi-final at North Shore RFC. Army scored in the 79th minute to win 15–10. The final was played at Auckland Uni RFC against the Australian Defence Force. The Army ran away winners 62–17 to become the first International Defence Rugby Union World Champions.

The United Kingdom hosted the second International Defence Rugby Competition in October 2015 coinciding with England holding the Rugby World Cup.

== Women's rugby ==
In 1996, the ARU officially recognised women's rugby union, which had been played in the army since the late 1980s. A women's inter-service competition was introduced in 2003 and since its inauguration the army teams have been its undisputed champions. In Nov 2010 LCpl Jane Leonard (Royal Engineers) won international honours with England Women playing and winning her first cap against New Zealand at Twickenham.

In 2010 the women's inter corps competition started with corps playing against each other. This has been a great incentive in the strengthening of the women's game in the Army. Over 200 women regularly play rugby in the inter corps competition.

== Sevens ==
For many years units have played rugby sevens, but there was no representative side. In 2000 that changed after Army XV players were used to help the England national team prepare for the IRB Sevens. The occasion gave rise to the creation of an Army Sevens team, which has become a significant force in the game, winning some of the sport's major competitions – including the Middlesex Sevens in 2001 and 2004. There are several Fijians in the side.

== Centenary year 2006/7 ==
In their centenary year (2006–07), the Army XV won the Inter-Services Competition, beating the RAF (54–10) and Royal Navy (39–25), for a record 6th successive time before they embarked on a tour of Australia and New Zealand, where they defeated teams fielded by the Australian Army (36–0) and the New Zealand Army (11–6).

== Notable former players ==
=== Scotland internationalists ===
The following former Army Rugby Union players have represented Scotland at full international level.

- (Scotland) John Anderson
- (Scotland) Thomas Bowie (Royal Army Medical Corps)
- (Scotland) Norman Bruce (Royal Army Ordnance Corps)
- (Scotland) Russell Bruce
- (Scotland) Angus Cameron (Royal Artillery)
- (Scotland) Mike Campbell-Lamerton (Duke of Wellington's Regiment)
- (Scotland) Frank Coutts
- (Scotland) James Dunlop (Royal Artillery)
- (Scotland) David Gilbert-Smith (Duke of Wellington's Regiment)
- (Scotland) Roland Gordon (Royal Artillery)
- (Scotland) Ryan Grant (Royal Signals)
- (Scotland) Andrew Hamilton (Royal Army Medical Corps)
- (Scotland) James Huggan (Royal Army Medical Corps)
- (Scotland) William Inglis (REME)
- (Scotland) Walter Irvine
- (Scotland) Henry Halcro Johnston
- (Scotland) John MacDonald (Royal Corps of Transport)
- (Scotland) Reginald Maitland (Royal Artillery)
- (Scotland) Frederick Maxwell (REME)
- (Scotland) Christian Melville
- (Scotland) Hugh McLeod
- (Scotland) Ernie Michie (REME)
- (Scotland) Robert Millar (REME)
- (Scotland) Hugh Monteith (Royal Army Medical Corps)
- (Scotland) Gordon Neilson
- (Scotland) Edward Innes Pocock
- (Scotland) Lewis Robertson
- (Scotland) Andrew Ross
- (Scotland) Edward Ross
- (Scotland) Ronald Scobie (REME)
- Ken Scotland (Royal Signals)
- (Scotland) Donald Scott
- (Scotland) Gregor Sharp
- (Scotland) Brian Shillinglaw (King's Own Scottish Borderers)
- (Scotland) John Simson (Royal Army Medical Corps)
- (Scotland) Ronald Simson (Royal Artillery)
- (Scotland) Doug Smith (Royal Army Medical Corps)
- (Scotland) Alexander Stewart
- (Scotland) Mattie Stewart
- (Scotland) Ian Swan (REME)
- (Scotland) Stephen Turk
- (Scotland) George Turnbull
- (Scotland) Charlie Usher
- (Scotland) Dave Valentine
- (Scotland) Rob Wainwright (Royal Army Medical Corps)
- (Scotland) Kenneth Wilson
- (Scotland) Arthur Young

=== Wales internationalists ===
The following former Army Rugby Union players have represented Wales at full international level.

- (Wales) Jack Matthews (Royal Army Medical Corps)
- (Wales) Haydn Morgan (REME)
- Frank Whitcombe (Royal Engineers) Wales & Great Britain Rugby League

=== England internationalists ===
The following former Army Rugby Union players have represented England at full international level.

- (England) Nim Hall (Duke of Wellington's Regiment)
- (England) Tim Rodber (Green Howards)
- (England) Semesa Rokoduguni (Royal Scots Dragoon Guards)
- (England) Ted Sadler (Royal Corps of Signals)

=== Ireland internationalists ===
The following former Army Rugby Union players have represented Ireland at full international level.

- (Ireland) Horsey Browne
- (Ireland) Mick Molloy
- (Ireland) Robin Roe
- (Ireland) Victor Pike
- (Ireland) John Dowse
- (Ireland) Ernest Deane
- (Ireland) Brian McCall
