= Thomas Bowie (rugby union) =

Scotland international rugby union player

- Born: Thomas Chalmers Bowie; 28 April 1889 Edinburgh, Scotland
- Died: 28 November 1972 (aged 83)

Rugby union career
- Position: Fly half
Amateur team(s)
Years	Team	Apps	(Points)
- Watsonians
–	Army Rugby Union		
Provincial / State sides
Years	Team	Apps	(Points)
1913	Edinburgh District		
1914	Blues Trial		
International career
Years	Team	Apps	(Points)
1913-14	Scotland	4	(0)

Thomas Bowie (28 April 1889 – 28 November 1972) was a Scotland international rugby union player.

== Rugby Union career ==
=== Amateur career ===
He played for Watsonians.

He also played for the Army Rugby Union.

=== Provincial career ===
He played for Edinburgh District against Glasgow District in the 1913 inter-city match.

He played for Blues Trial against Whites Trial in their January 1914 match.

=== International career ===
He played for Scotland 4 times in the period 1913 - 1914.

== Medical career ==
He graduated from Edinburgh University with a degree in medicine and surgery in 1915.

== Military career ==
During the First World War, he joined the Royal Army Medical Corps. He was given a temporary commission of Lieutenant on 21 January 1916.

He served in Mesopotamia in 1916; and his commission was made permanent in 1917.

After Mesopotamia, he served in India to 1920.

He was promoted to Captain on 21 July 1919. He returned to Mesopotamia from 1920 to 1921, then served in Constantinople from 1922 to 1923.

Bowie was still a captain in the RAMC by the time of his marriage in 1923; and based in Aldershot.

From 1923 to 1927 he was based in the Rhine.

He was eventually promoted to Major on 21 January 1928, exactly 12 years after his first temporary commission.

He was based in China from 1927 to 1929 with the 2nd battalion of Scots Guards.

He retired on 21 January 1936; however he rejoined the military on 25 August 1939.

== Family ==
His father was John Sharpe Bowie. He was named as a deceased Clerk in Holy Orders by Thomas Bowie's marriage certificate in 1923.

John Sharpe Bowie had 3 sons Hector, John and Thomas - Thomas was the youngest - and a daughter Mary.

Thomas married Valerie Ermyntrude Morris on 2 May 1923 in Swansea. Valerie was a widow, her first husband Eric Belfield had died in 1917, killed in action in the First World War with the Middlesex Regiment. She was the daughter of Sir Robert Armine Morris, 4th Baronet of Clasemount, and Lucy Augusta Cory.

Valerie and Thomas retired to Gullane in East Lothian; but occasionally still made newspaper headlines by attending Chepstow races in 1956 and visiting Caswell Bay in Swansea.
