= Stanley Harper =

- Born: Stanley George Anthony Harper; 29 November 1912 Edinburgh, Scotland
- Died: 7 April 1992 (aged 79) Pietermaritzburg, South Africa

Rugby union career
- Position: Flanker
Amateur team(s)
Years	Team	Apps	(Points)
- Watsonians
–	Royal Navy Rugby		
Provincial / State sides
Years	Team	Apps	(Points)
1935	Edinburgh District		
International career
Years	Team	Apps	(Points)
1942	Scotland	1	(0)

Stanley Harper (29 November 1912 - 7 April 1992) was a Scotland international rugby union player.

== Rugby Union career ==
=== Amateur career ===
He played for Watsonians.

During the Second World War, he joined the Royal Navy and played for their rugby side.

=== Provincial career ===
He played for Edinburgh District in December 1935 in the inter-city match against Glasgow.

=== International career ===
Harper played in the 21 March 1942 Services International match against England for Scotland. As a Services international, Harper was finally given a retrospective cap in 2023.

== Death ==
He died at Grey's Hospital in Pietermaritzburg on 7 April 1992.
