= 1873–74 Scottish Districts season =

Rugby union competition

- Countries: Scotland
- Date: 1872-73
- Matches played: 2

The 1873–74 Scottish Districts season is a record of all the rugby union matches for Scotland's district teams.

It includes the Inter-City fixtures between Glasgow District and Edinburgh District.

== History ==
The matches here remain 20 - a - side. These matches, with more players on the park, made it harder to score.

In addition, scoring a try did not count for points. The try gave you an attempt to get a score by means of the conversion; if the conversion was missed then it did not benefit the try scoring team. It was only goals that mattered.

The second inter-city match here is a case in point. Edinburgh scored a try but missed the conversion. Hence the match ended in a draw.

== Results ==
Date	Try	Conversion	Penalty	Dropped goal	Goal from mark	Notes
1871–1875	no score	1 goal	1 goal	1 goal	—	

=== Inter-City ===
6 December 1873

Edinburgh District	0 - 0	Glasgow District
	Report

Raeburn Place, Edinburgh
Referee: 4,000

Edinburgh District: J. L. Patullo (Edinburgh Wanderers), W. Blackwood (back), Angus Buchanan (Royal HSFP) (quarter back), G. Couper (Warriston) (half back), A. Finlay and J. Finlay- Forsyth, Bulldog Irvine (Edinburgh Academicals) (captain), J. Leslie (Royal HSFP) (back), R. Lindsay, John Lisle Hall McFarlane (Edinburgh University) (quarter back), Thomas Roger Marshall (Edinburgh Academicals) (half back), James Andrew Whitelock Mein (Edinburgh Academicals), Alexander Petrie (Royal HSFP), G. Rayner (Royal HSFP) (back), A. Reid, Duncan Robertson (Edinburgh Academicals) and James Robertson (Royal HSFP), Alexander Stewart (Edinburgh University) (quarter back), Charles Villar (Warriston), and P. Wood, A. C. Rose (Edinburgh Wanderers)
Glasgow District: H. W. Allan, Allan Arthur, W. D. Brown (Glasgow Academicals) (back), C. C. Bryce, F. Chalmers (Glasgow Academicals) (back), G. R. Flemming, J. S. Carrick (Glasgow Academicals) and J. Y. Kennedy, W. H. Kidston (West of Scotland) (back), G. B. and J. H. M'Clure (West of Scotland) (quarter backs), J. Napier (Glasgow University), J. and T. Neilson, J. S. Thompson, J. K. Tod, and R. W. Wilson, J. Reid (Glasgow Academicals), G. Heron (Glasgow Academicals), D. M. Brunton (Glasgow University)

24 January 1874

Glasgow District	0 - 1 try	Edinburgh District
	Report	Try: John Lisle Hall McFarlane

Hamilton Crescent, Glasgow

Glasgow District: W. D. Brown (captain) (Glasgow Academicals), J. S. Carrick (Glasgow Academicals), T. Chalmers (Glasgow Academicals), W. H. Kidston (West of Scotland), J. W. Arthur (Glasgow Academicals), J. H. McClure (West of Scotland), Allan Arthur, H. W. Allan, C. C. Bryce, G. R. Fleming, J. S. Thompson, J. K. Tod, G. Heron, J. S. Tod (all Glasgow Academicals), J. S. Kennedy, J. Neilson, T. Neilson, R. W. Wilson (all West of Scotland), J. Napier, D. M. Brunton (both Glasgow University)
Edinburgh District: J. Leslie (Royal HSFP), T. Marshall (Edinburgh Academicals), G. Rayner (Royal HSFP), John Lisle Hall McFarlane (Edinburgh University), G. Drysdale (Merchistonians), E. Carswell (Edinburgh Wanderers), Alexander Stewart (Edinburgh University), Bulldog Irvine (Edinburgh Academicals), J. Mein (Edinburgh Academicals), J. Finlay (Edinburgh Academicals), A. Finlay (Edinburgh Academicals), D. Robertson (Edinburgh Academicals), Arthur Young (Edinburgh Academicals), R. Lindsay (Edinburgh University), A. G. Petrie (Royal HSFP), J. Knott (Royal HSFP), J. G. Robertson (Edinburgh Academicals), J. Reid (Edinburgh Wanderers), Charles Villar (Warriston)

=== Other Scottish matches ===
No other District matches played.

=== English matches ===
No other District matches played.

=== International matches ===
No touring matches this season.
