= Horsey Browne =

Irish rugby union player

- Born: William Fraser Browne; 29 January 1903 Longford; Ireland
- Died: 23 May 1931 (aged 28)

Rugby union career
- Position(s): Flanker, prop, No. 8
Senior career
Years	Team	Apps	(Points)
- Devonport Services RFC
–	United Services RFC		
–	Army		
International career
Years	Team	Apps	(Points)
1925–1928	Ireland	12	(3)

William Fraser "Horsey" Browne (1903–1931) was a British army and Irish rugby international. He won 12 caps between 1925 and 1928. He started playing whilst serving as a lieutenant in the Duke of Wellington's Regiment.

Played for both Devonport Services RFC and United Services RFC.
