= Army Navy Match =

British rugby match

The Army Navy Match Part of the Inter-Service Championship
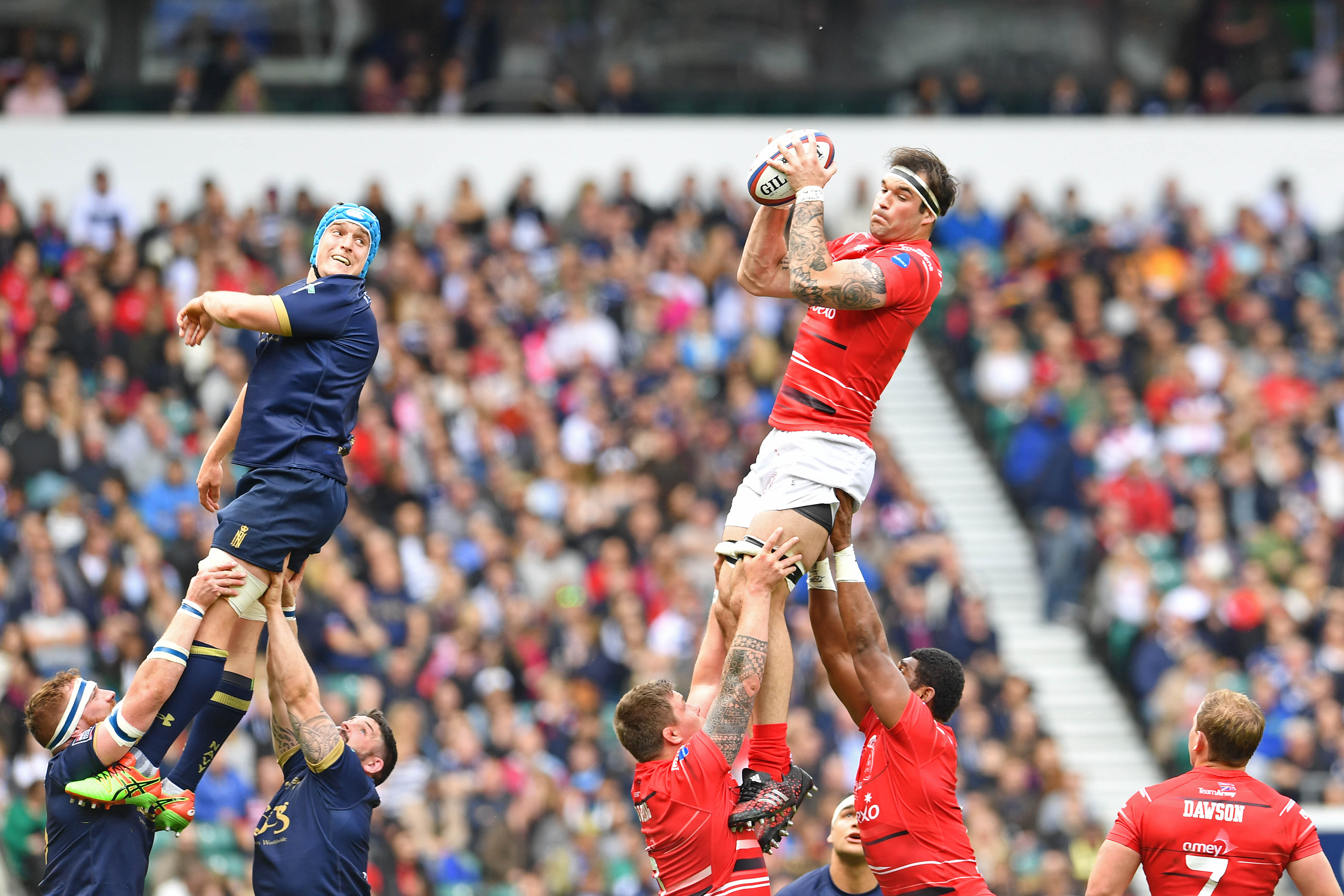
- The Army Navy Match 2017
- Location: London
- Teams: British Army (ARU); Royal Navy (RNRU)
- First meeting: 13 February 1878 (Annually since 6 March 1909)
- Latest meeting: 02 May 2026; Navy 41-36
- Next meeting: 03 May 2027
- Broadcasters: BFBS
- Stadiums: Twickenham Stadium
- Trophy: The Babcock Trophy

Statistics
- All-time series (Inter-Service Championship only): Army 63, Navy 38, Draws 4 (1939, 1969 1980 and 2016)
- Largest victory: Army, 50–7 (2009)
- Smallest victory: Navy 11–10 (1921), Navy 9–8 (1948), Navy 17–16 (1978), Army 10–9 (1983), Army 43-42 (2024)
- The above statistics do not include the matches before the first official match in 1907. 1907 was the first official Army Navy match played after the formation of the Army Rugby Union in 1906. The Royal Navy Rugby Union did not form until the 1907/08 season.

Other information
- Current sponsor: Babcock International

The Army Navy Match is an rugby union match played between the senior XV teams of the Royal Navy and British Army. It is the most viewed and anticipated match of the Inter-Service Championship, with the winner being awarded the Babcock Trophy. Since 1914 it has been held at Twickenham Stadium. (Note: Since 2024 Twickenham Stadium has been known as the "Allianz Stadium, Twickenham".)

The first meeting of the teams was a match played between the officers of the British Army and the officers of the Royal Navy on 13 February 1878. It was not until 1907 that the Army Navy Match became an annual fixture. For the first fixture the match secretary was Surg. Lt George Levick RN. From 1909 it was jointly administered by the newly formed Royal Navy Rugby Union and the Army Rugby Union. In 1920 service personnel who were not officers were allowed to play for the first time. Since then it has been played every season, except during the world wars (1914–19 and 1940–45) and the COVID-19 pandemic, when the matches were suspended.

== Brief background ==
Traditionally, the Army Navy Match has been played in the second half of the domestic season. In the 1907–08 season it was played in December, and due to this anomaly the calendar year 1908 did not see an Army Navy Match, while 1907 saw two.

Originally only officers of both services where allowed to represent their services senior XV teams, and the fixtures where styled "Officers of the Navy" v. "Officers of the Army". in 1920 the fixture was re-styled "Royal Navy" v. "The Army" and teams where to allowed to select their players from all personnel, including other ranks and ratings. To mark this change, the 1920 match was attended by King George V.

The 2016 Army Navy was the 99th in the series and the match saw a new record crowd of 81,323. The Navy took the lead 7–0 (Dave Fairbrother) on 20 minutes before the Army scored three tries (Semesa Rokoduguni 2, Owain Davies) before half time to lead 19–7 at the beak. A further try for the Army (James Farrell) early in the second period saw them extend their lead to 26–7 with half an hour of the match remaining. The Royal Navy staged the most remarkable of comebacks, with tries from Gareth Rees and Rhys Dymmock-Williams either side of a penalty try to level the scores at 26–26 with 9 minutes remaining. An Owain Davies penalty with two minutes to go seemed to seal the win for the Army before a Royal Navy fullback landed a 45m penalty of his own to again tie the game 29–29 with less than a minute to go. The draw meant that the Army Navy Trophy was shared but the Royal Navy were Inter-Service Champions, having beaten the RAF 9–8 at USSG Portsmouth. The RAF had beaten the Army 13–12 at RAF Halton in the opening round of the Inter-Services. Royal Navy Number 8 completed a remarkable game which included a try, a yellow card and being named Man of the Match.

The 2017 Army Navy match was unable to live up to the onfield excitement from the year before. However the 100th match saw another record crowd (81,577), the attendance of Prince Harry as Patron of the Match Charity, Invictus Games Foundation, and an Army win 29–20.

The 101st Army Navy Match was played at Twickenham on 5 May 2018 with the Army winning 22–14. The match was notable in that the Navy had one man sent off in the first ten minutes of the game and the Army took advantage of their wing overlap to good effect. Army Corporal Matthew Dawson was awarded the Babcock Man of the Match.

== Stadium ==
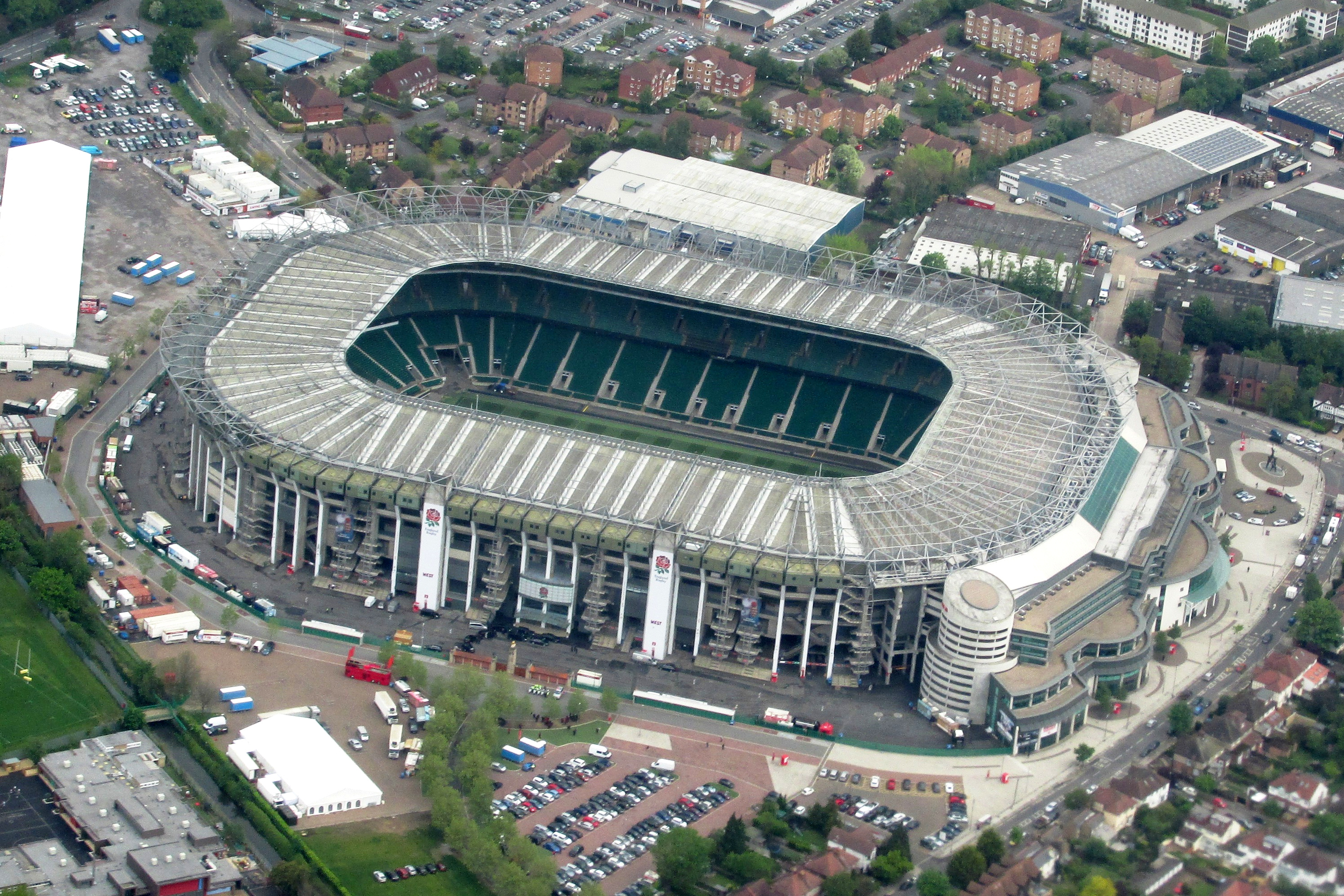
Twickenham Stadium, where the Army Navy Match takes place

At the first meeting of the two teams in 1878, the match was played at The Oval. In 1907 it moved to The Queen's Club in Kensington. Since 1914 the match has been held at Twickenham Stadium, (Note: Since 2024 the stadium is styled "The Allianz Stadium, Twickenham".) the largest rugby union stadium in the world, with a capacity of 82,000. It is also the home ground of the England National Team.

The fixture constantly draws large crowds to Twickenham, the largest attendance being 81,577 in 2017.

Due to the size of the fixture, some local residents have made complaints about the disorderly conduct of some supporters outside of the stadium.

== Team colours ==
Navy – navy-blue shorts, socks and shirt.

Army – white shorts, red shirt and socks.

In the first match of 1878 the Army played in white. The Navy have always played in blue jerseys, though in 1955 their shorts were white.

== The First Army Navy game 1878 ==
The first Army vs Navy game was held on 13 February 1878 at The Oval, London, between officers of both services. The contemporary newspaper The Broad Arrow gave the following account of the match:

A fine exhibition of football delighted the somewhat small number of spectators. Bush scored the first try for the Navy from a scrummage near the line. The goal was kicked by Orford. A band of naval spectators who had taken up their position beneath a white ensign mounted on the roof of a drag greeted this score with great cheering. The greasy state of the ground was not favourable for any great display of running. Encouraged by a cry from their supporters 'Come on Navy, Force the Passage of the Straights' the Navy mounted great pressure and scored a touch down. In the second half the Navy scored a second try. Wrench of the Army took advantage of some bad passing by the Navy and scored the Army try: The goal was kicked but this ended the scoring and the Navy deservedly won the first match between the Services.

The full version of the report from the Broad Arrow seems to suggest that the correct quote of 'Force the Passage of the Straits' was used.

The Army selectors made a generous contribution towards the Navy victory by selecting a Royal Artillery officer, R. Bannatyne, as Team Captain. He was serving overseas at the time and received no notification of his selection. As a result, he was absent for the game. The situation was further confounded by the fact that another Army player arrived late and missed a good part of the match.

The teams were:

British Army		Royal Navy
Name	Regiment/Corps	Name
R. A. Bannatyne (Capt.)	Royal Artillery	F. Campbell
C. F. Crombie	37th North Hampshire Regiment	C. Bishop
C. H. Coke	86th Royal County Down Regiment	E. Daniells
J. N. Cowan	Royal Engineers	C. Hart
F. C. Heath	Royal Engineers	P. Bush
A. J. C. French	76th Regiment of Foot	J. Startin
A. R. Barker	Royal Artillery	G. Henderson (Capt)
A. J. Street	Unidentified	J. Orford
J. Spens	85th King's Light Infantry	C. Trower
I. M. Urquhart	108th Regiment of Foot (Madras Infantry)	R. Montgomerie
G. Campbell	77th Regiment (East Middlesex)	J. Bennett
I. G. Adamson	108th Foot	F. Thring
Gould-Adams	1st Royal Scots Regiment	H. Goldfinch
T. H. Manser	Army Hospital Corps	C. Bayly
S. Ogilvie	Unidentified	C. Walters

== The first "official" Army Navy game (1907) ==
The Army Rugby Union was formed in 1906. The exact date of formation of the Royal Navy Rugby Union is shrouded in doubt, but it is likely to have been towards the end of 1907, after the first official Army v. Navy Match. February 1907 was when the first match organised by the two services in a formal manner was played, with Surg. Lt George Levick RN acting as the match secretary. The match was held at the Queen's Club, West Kensington, and was won by the Officers of the Royal Navy 15–14. The match was played at Queen's Club until 1914. After the First World War the first match was hosted by Twickenham in 1920, and the game has been played there ever since.

== Anniversary Army Navy Matches ==
The first eight matches were played at Queen's Club. Currently the 101 matches have resulted in 62 Army wins, 35 Navy wins and 4 draws, which includes the thrilling 29–29 draw in 2016. The Royal Navy won the first match in 1907 but the Army have won the other anniversary matches. On 7 March 1936 the Army won the 25th match 12–3, in 1967 they won the 50th match 6–3, in 1992 they won the 75th match 16–9 and in 2017 they won the 100th match 29–20.

== Match results ==
=== Early matches (1878–1906) ===
Year	Venue	Winner	Points	Loser	Points
1878	Queen's Club	Royal Navy	1G1T	Army	1G
1880	Portsmouth	Royal Navy	1G3T	Army	0
1905	Queen's Club	Army	10	Royal Navy	0
1906	Devonport	Royal Navy	17	Army	3

It is quite probable that other matches were played in this time for which records are not known.

=== Pre Inter-Services Championship matches (1907–1914) ===
Year	Venue	Winner	Points	Loser	Points
1907	Queen's Club	Royal Navy	15	Army	14
1907	Queen's Club	Royal Navy	15	Army	0
1909	Queen's Club	Royal Navy	25	Army	0
1910	Queen's Club	Royal Navy	19	Army	10
1911	Queen's Club	Army	22	Royal Navy	13
1912	Queen's Club	Royal Navy	16	Army	8
1913	Queen's Club	Royal Navy	18	Army	8
1914	Queen's Club	Army	26	Royal Navy	14
1915-1919	No matches played due to First World War				

- The first match that was an official Army Navy Match was in 1907, after the Army Rugby Union had formed in 1906 and with the Royal Navy moving towards formation. The match secretary was Surg. Lt George Levick and there was a charge for entry. The matches in 1878, 1880, 1905 and 1906 do not count towards the official record of matches between the two sides, with February 1907 being the first and 29 April 2017 the 100th match.
- 2010 and 2020–2021 are the only years in which an Inter-Service match has not taken place for a reason other than world war. The 2010 match was cancelled as the Army were stranded in their overseas training camp in South Africa due to flight disruptions caused by the eruptions of Eyjafjallajökull. In 2020–2021 all three Inte- Service matches were cancelled due to restrictions placed on sport by Covid-19.

=== Overall results ===
Overall results for official Army Navy Matches Including 1878 meeting
Army	Draws	Navy
(63)	(4)	(38)
1911 1914 1924; 1925 1926 1928; 1929 1930 1932; 1933 1934 1935; 1936 1937 1946; 1947 1949 1950; 1952 1953 1956; 1957 1960 1962; 1963 1964 1965; 1967 1968 1972; 1976 1979 1982; 1983 1984 1985; 1988 1989 1990; 1991 1992 1993; 1994 1997 1998; 1999 2000 2002; 2003 2004 2005; 2006 2007 2008; 2009 2011 2012; 2013 2014 2015; 2017 2018 2024	1939 1969 1980; 2016	1878 1907 1907; 1909 1910 1912; 1913 1920 1921; 1922 1923 1927; 1931 1938 1948; 1951 1954 1955; 1958 1959 1961; 1966 1970 1971; 1973 1974 1975; 1977 1978 1981; 1986 1987 1995; 1996 2001 2010; 2023 2025
