= Norman Bruce =

Scotland international rugby union player

- Born: Norman Scott Bruce; 28 June 1932 Edinburgh, Scotland
- Died: 28 March 1992 (aged 59) Kinnerley, England

Rugby union career
- Position: Hooker
Amateur team(s)
| Years | Team | Apps | (Points) |
| - | Gala YM | | |
| - | Gala | | |
| 1957- | Blackheath | | |
| - | Royal Army Ordnance Corps | | |
| - | Army Rugby Union | | |
| - | Combined Services | | |
| 1960-66 | London Scottish | | |
Provincial / State sides
| Years | Team | Apps | (Points) |
| 1955 | South of Scotland District | | |
| 1957 | Whites Trial | | |
| 1957 | Scotland Probables | | |
| 1957- | Hampshire | | |
International career
| Years | Team | Apps | (Points) |
| 1958-64 | Scotland | 31 | (9) |

Norman Bruce (28 June 1932 – 28 March 1992) was a Scotland rugby union international player.

== Rugby Union career ==
=== Amateur career ===
Bruce first played for Gala YM and then Gala.

The Berwickshire News and General Advertiser of 1 February 1955 notes:

There will be no early return of Norman Bruce as a regular player for Gala. The popular Gala hooker, who is now a sergeant in the R.A.O.C., has signed on with the Army for a 22-year engagement. Bruce has been doing well in Army Rugby and is hooking for an Army XV. against the Civil Service in a side which includes seven internationalists. One of his props will be Hughie McLeod, the Hawick cap. The permanent loss of Bruce is a big blow to the Netherdale club.

He played for Blackheath. He brought the Blackheath side back to Gala shortly after he moved to England and they won the Gala Sevens that year. While he was back in Galashiels he managed to sneak in a match for Gala YM over Hawick YM in the Border Junior League.

He then played for the Army Rugby Union. He played for the Royal Army Ordnance Corps, captained the Army side, and played for Combined Services.

He then played for London Scottish.

=== Provincial career ===
He played for South of Scotland District in 1955.

He played for Whites Trial against Blues Trial in 1957, while still with Blackheath.

After impressing in that trial match he was selected for Scotland Probables against Scotland Possibles two weeks later.

He played for Hampshire. The Hampshire County side usually played him out of position as a prop, though he did captain the side.

=== International career ===
He was capped by Scotland 31 times between 1958 and 1964.

He played for the Barbarians in 1957.

== Military career ==
He joined the Royal Army Ordnance Corps around 1955–56. He was posted to Brunei as a Major. He was later promoted to Lieutenant Colonel and ran the Army School of Physical Training, before moving to Regimental Wing COD Donnington.
