= Inter-Service Rugby Championship =

British Rugby union competition

- Sport: Rugby Union
- Instituted: 1920
- Competing unions: ARU (British Army); RNRU (Royal Navy); RAFRU (Royal Air Force)
- Current champion: Army (2024)
- Most titles: Army (48 titles)
- Website: Website
- Broadcast partners: BFBS; RugbyPass TV

The Inter-Service Rugby Championship, commonly known as the Inter-Service Championship, is an annual tournament played between the rugby union teams of the British Armed Forces. The largest and most viewed fixture of the Championship is the Army Navy Match which is played at Twickenham Stadium.

The tournament has been played annually since 1920, with breaks only occurring during The Second World War and the COVID-19 pandemic. The championships primary broadcaster is BFBS, and since 2024 the senior men's and women's matches have also been streamed globally on RugbyPass TV. Sponsors of the tournament include Babcock International, which since 2025 has been the primary sponsor of the tournament, as well as other sponsors including BT and Rohde & Schwarz.

The current reigning champion is the British Army, after winning their 48th title.

== History ==
Since 1907, Army Rugby and Royal Navy Rugby had competed against each other annually in the Army Navy Match. In 1918 the newly formed Royal Air Force created their own rugby team. The decision was made in 1920 to create a tournament that included the RAF Rugby Union Team as Britain recovered from the First World War. At the time the championship was created the decision had already taken place which allowed teams to select both officers and other ranks. The first three tournaments saw the Royal Navy dominating, until the Royal Air Force won their first Inter-service Championship in 1923. The Army did not win their first match until 1926, but since then the Army have been the dominant force of the Inter-Service Championship winning 48 titles.

From 1924 all matches of the Inter-Service Championship were held at Twickenham Stadium in London, which continued to be the case until 1998 when the decision was made to only play the Army Navy Match at Twickenham. This was due to the Army Navy Match having the largest number of spectators and greatest interest due to the historical rivalry of the two sides, matches besides Army v Navy now take place at various Premiership Rugby stadiums as well as other grounds across the UK.

A "veteran" tournament was added to the Championship in 1996 for older service personnel to play in, originally over the age of 40, in recent years this tournament has been renamed to the "Masters" Inter Service Championship, to avoid confusion that the players are retired military veterans. in In 2003 the tournament was expanded to include a Women's Inter-Services championship with the Army winning the inaugural women's championship. To date the Women's Royal Navy Rugby Union has not won a championship and the RAF Women's team has won one championship. Following the introduction of a Women's Championship an under-23 XV Inter-service championship was created.

Currently there are four tournaments that make up the Inter Service Championship with the most viewed and attended still being the Men's Inter-Service Championship, with the Women's tournament being the second-most viewed, both tournaments have service personnel who represent professional teams at the highest levels.

== Army Navy Match ==
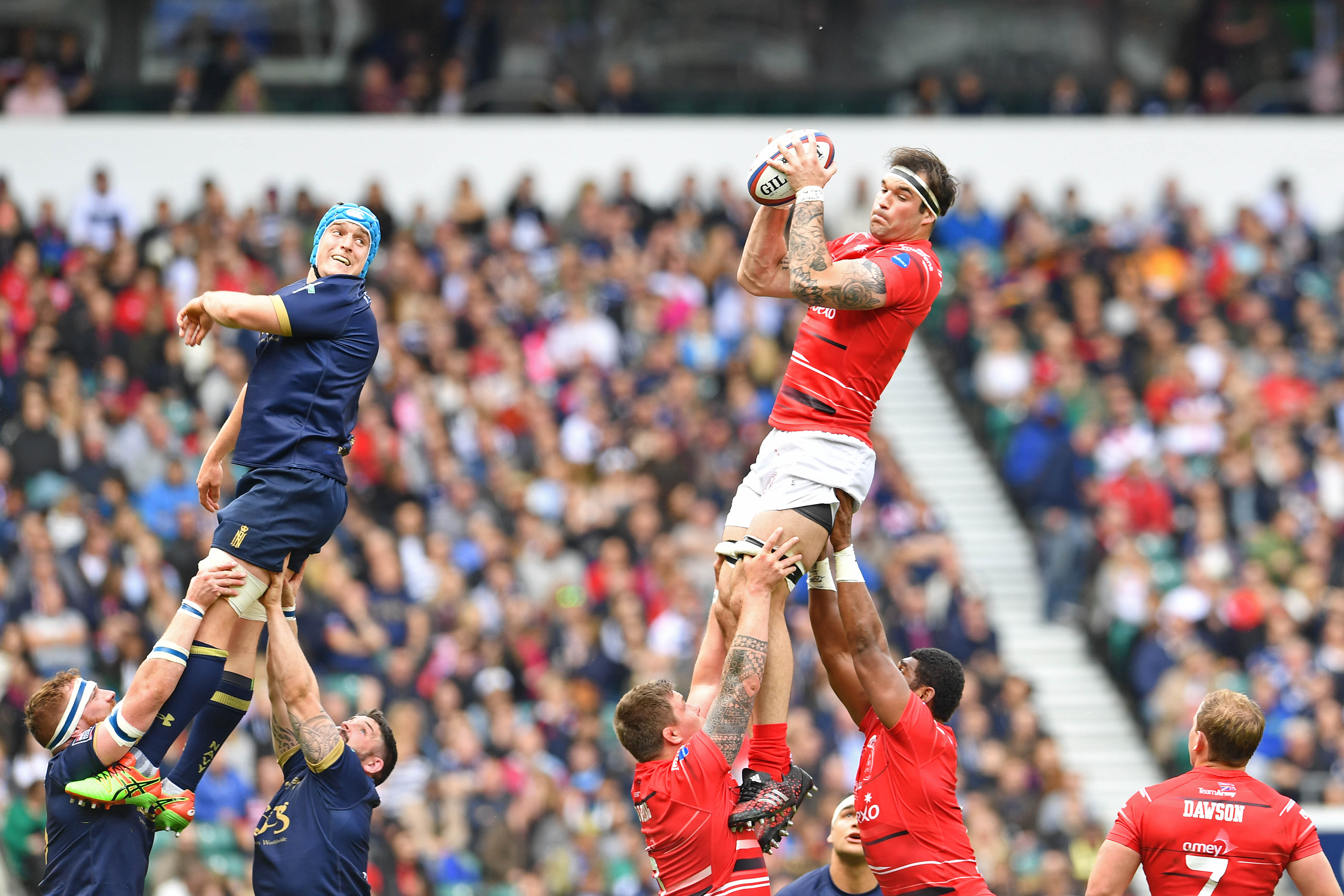
The Army Navy match at Twickenham Stadium, 2017

The largest and most viewed match of the tournament in the historic Army Navy Match which is held at Twickenham. in 2017 the Army Navy match had the largest crowd of any Inter-Service Rugby Championship match in history at 81,577 spectators.

The match is sponsored by Babcock International and the winner is awarded the Babcock Trophy.

== Men's Inter-Services Championship results (1920–) ==
In 1920 a Tri-Service competition was created to include the newly formed Royal Air Force (RAF). However, the great rivalry between the Army and Navy has continued and their match, now held at the home of the English Rugby Football Union (Twickenham Stadium), remains the highlight of the annual inter-services rugby competition.

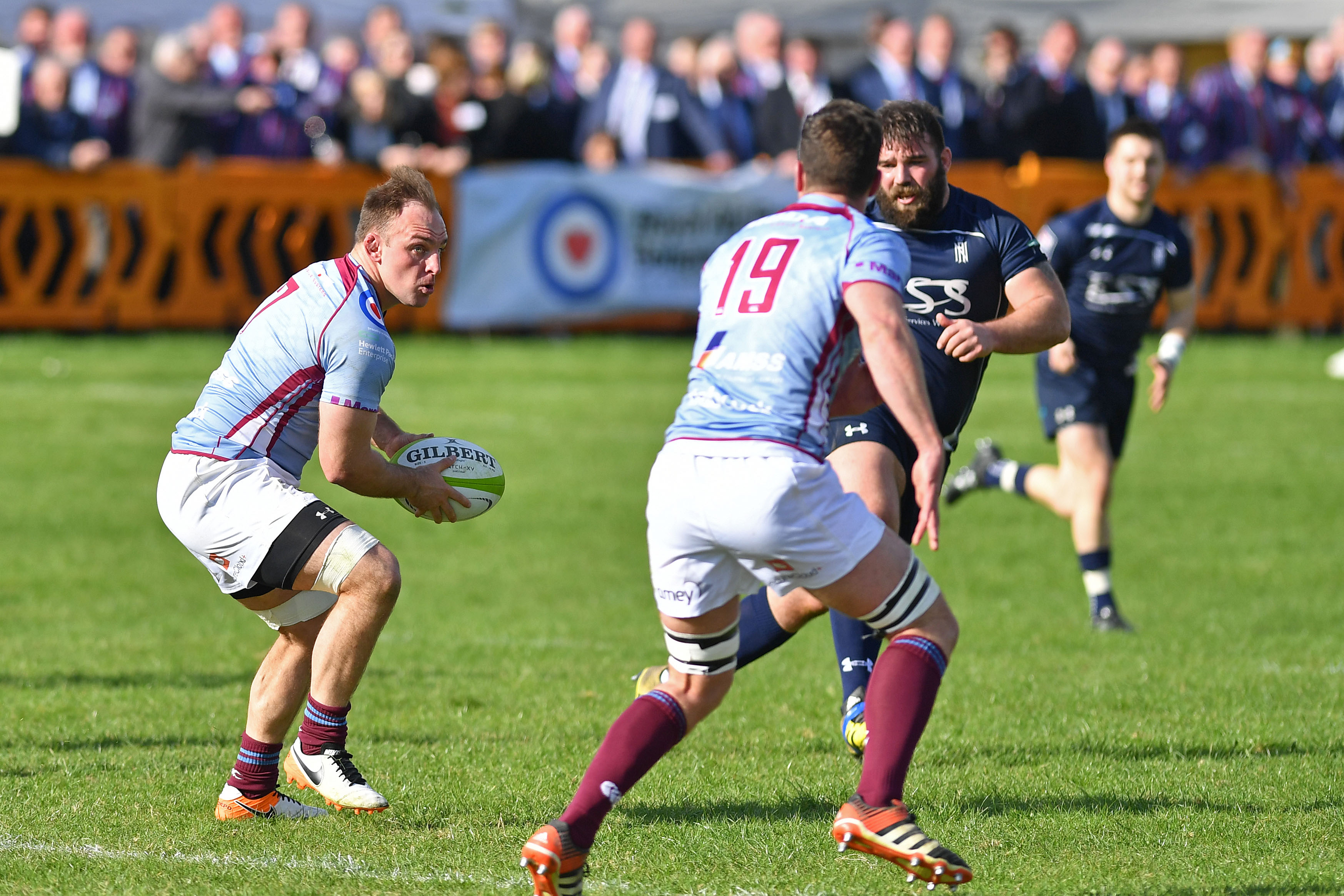
RAF Men's XV vs RN Men's XV during the 2017 Inter-Service Championship

Men's Inter-Services Championship
Teams:	Army Rugby Union Royal Navy Rugby Union Royal Air Force Rugby Union	
Originated:	1920	
Championship Series:	Army leads with 48 outright championships	
Recent Winner:	Army	
Army (48) 1926 1928 1929 1930 1932 1933 1934 1936 1937 1946 1950 1952 1953 1957 1960 1963 1964 1965 1967 1968 1969 1972 1976 1980 1983 1988 1989 1990 1997 1998 1999 2000 2002 2003 2004 2005 2006 2007 2008 2009 2011 2012 2013 2014 2017 2019 2022 2024	Royal Navy (21) 1920 1921 1922 1927 1931 1938 1939 1951 1961 1966 1970 1973 1974 1977 1981 1987 1995 2001 2010 2016 2023	Royal Air Force (16) 1923 1947 1955 1958 1959 1962 1971 1979 1982 1985 1986 1991 1993 1994 2015 2018
Three Way Ties (10) 1924 1935 1948 1954 1956 1975 1978 1984 1992 1996
Two Way Ties (2) 1925 1949 Both Between Army and Royal Air Force

=== Men's yearly breakdown of results ===
Army victories are shown in ██ red, Royal Navy victories in ██ navy, Royal Air Force victories in ██ light blue. Tied games and tied seasons are shown in ██ white.

Year	Champion	Army – Navy score	Army – RAF score	Navy – RAF score
1920	Royal Navy	32-11	21-9	12-3
1921	Royal Navy	11-10	26-3	33-3
1922	Royal Navy	7-3	23-8	9-6
1923	Royal Air Force	16-11	13-5	3-0
1924	Tie	19-5	8-3	16-9
1925	Army & Royal Air Force	11-8	6-6	3-0
1926	Army	24-10	11-0	8-3
1927	Royal Navy	6-3	22-0	8-3
1928	Army	11-5	18-6	5-0
1929	Army	17-11	27-0	8-3
1930	Army	16-10	14-8	8-3
1931	Royal Navy	6-0	16-5	16-0
1932	Army	11-0	21-4	22-5
1933	Army	19-0	12-3	14-3
1934	Army	16-8	14-3	36-0
1935	Tie	11-8	6-3	13-8
1936	Army	12-3	16-3	3-0
1937	Army	14-3	29-9	3-3
1938	Royal Navy	10-9	15-7	10-6
1939	Royal Navy	6-6	18-3	8-3
1940-45	No matches played due to Second World War			
1946	Army	11-6	11-6	9-6
1947	Royal Air Force	19-11	8-0	5-5
1948	Tie	9-8	15-8	16-11
1949	Army & Royal Air Force	23-3	3-3	11-0
1950	Army	16-6	11-3	6-6
1951	Royal Navy	11-0	14-0	6-5
1952	Army	11-3	9-6	6-0
1953	Army	3-0	11-3	3-3
1954	Tie	8-6	16-3	12-6
1955	Royal Air Force	8-3	6-6	6-3
1956	Tie	6-3	26-9	11-9
1957	Army	6-3	14-9	8-6
1958	Royal Air Force	14-0	3-3	14-3
1959	Royal Air Force	6-0	11-3	12-9
1960	Army	12-3	6-3	8-0
1961	Royal Navy	6-3	19-11	9-3
1962	Royal Air Force	9-6	19-14	12-6
1963	Army	11-3	8-6	3-0
1964	Army	8-0	19-6	5-3
1965	Army	5-3	11-11	15-6
1966	Royal Navy	10-9	12-3	11-3
1967	Army	6-3	17-6	5-3
1968	Army	9-6	3-3	17-15
1969	Army	3-3	26-21	9-5
1970	Royal Navy	15-9	15-12	13-6
1971	Royal Air Force	11-9	6-6	17-6
1972	Army	13-3	14-6	18-4
1973	Royal Navy	10-7	19-9	15-0
1974	Royal Navy	25-3	9-4	23-13
1975	Tie	19-0	41-13	20-7
1976	Army	15-6	6-3	21-13
1977	Royal Navy	16-0	19-13	15-9
1978	Tie	17-16	16-6	15-8
1979	Royal Air Force	10-3	10-3	23-6
1980	Army	0-0	26-7	16-7
1981	Royal Navy	7-3	6-4	15-12
1982	Royal Air Force	11-7	10-6	16-14
1983	Army	10-9	16-7	8-4
1984	Tie	13-6	15-9	10-9
1985	Royal Air Force	11-6	15-12	29-23
1986	Royal Air Force	13-3	16-13	20-9
1987	Royal Navy	21-10	12-12	13-6
1988	Army	35-3	26-3	10-7
1989	Army	21-9	42-10	30-23
1990	Army	16-7	32-14	22-14
1991	Royal Air Force	10-0	32-12	22-13
1992	Tie	16-9	18-6	22-13
1993	Royal Air Force	37-15	20-17	23-7
1994	Royal Air Force	18-6	28-22	22-12
1995	Royal Navy	34-17	28-26	43-19
1996	Tie	9-6	31-23	14-12
1997	Army	18-16	35-35	24-24
1998	Army	36-22	23-7	11-8
1999	Army	24-13	43-8	28-7
2000	Army	32-14	13-11	23-5
2001	Royal Navy	31-20	13-8	23-3
2002	Army	18-13	74-3	24-19
2003	Army	53-16	52-13	34-27
2004	Army	32-16	46-6	49-5
2005	Army	41-15	55-12	24-16
2006	Army	9-3	82-10	34-6
2007	Army	39-25	54-10	57-3
2008	Army	22-11	42-6	67-12
2009	Army	50-7	67-11	34-20
2010	Royal Navy	24-22	No Match	73-3
2011	Army	44-10	52-0	52-3
2012	Army	48-9	59-0	13-6
2013	Army	43-26	33-18	55-26
2014	Army	30-17	35-26	10-0
2015	Royal Air Force	36-18	33-29	32-32
2016	Royal Navy	29-29	13-12	9-8
2017	Army	29-20	35-14	16-14
2018	Royal Air Force	22-14	20-19	31-21
2019	Army	27-11	49-3	25-10
2020-21	No matches played due to COVID-19			
2022	Army	35-27	35-20	18-10
2023	Royal Navy	39-22	48-17	13-13

== Women's Inter-Services Championship results (2003–) ==
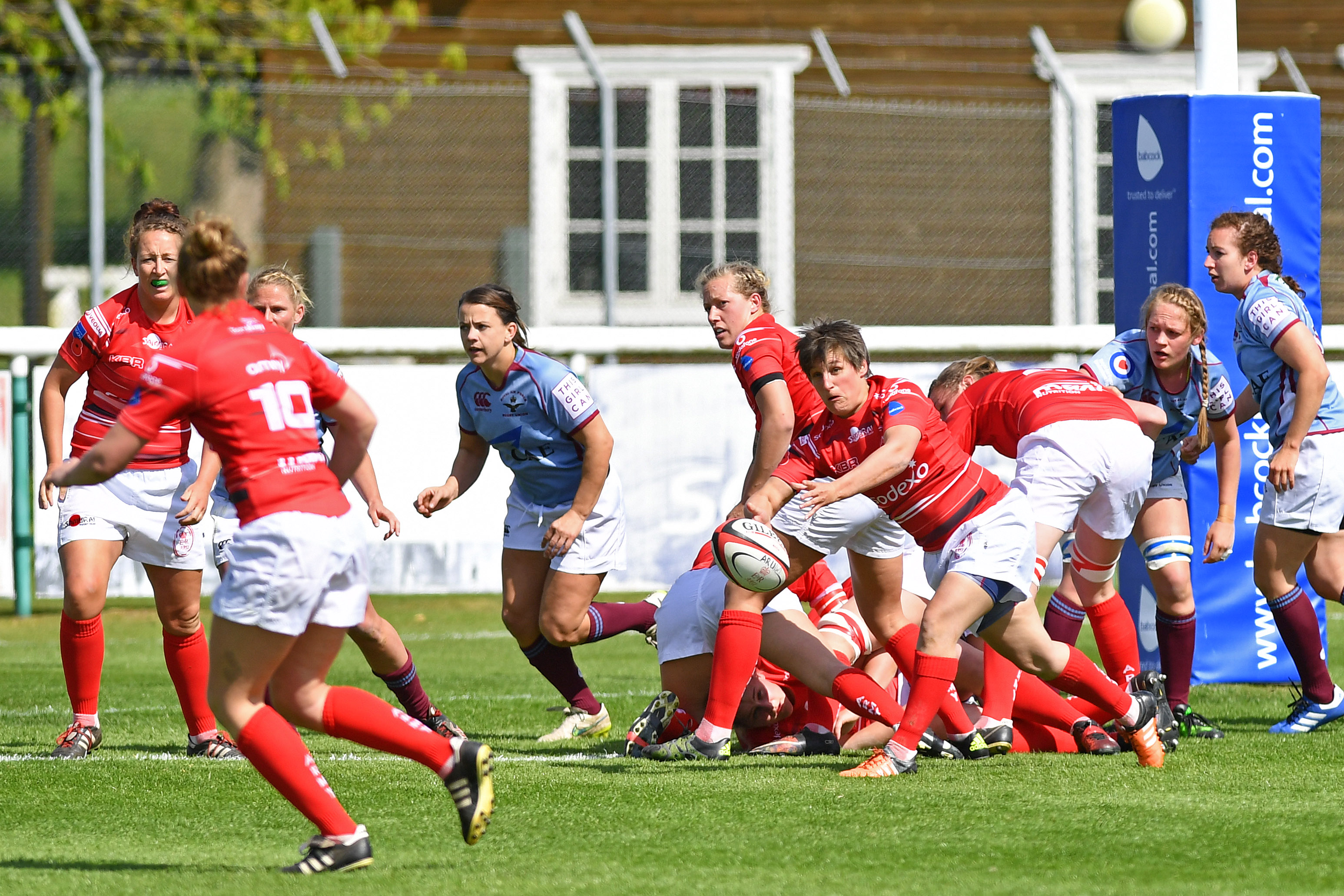
Army Women's vs RAF Women's during the 2017 Inter-Service Championship

Since 2003 the women from the three Armed Services have been fielding their own rugby teams and have been competing in an annual inter-service competition. Prior to this the Royal Air Force Women had played the Royal Navy in 2002, winning 18-5. In 2019 the Royal Air Force won their first Inter Service title ending the Army's 32 match unbeaten run.

Women's Inter-Services Championship
Teams:	Army Rugby Union Royal Navy Rugby Union Royal Air Force Rugby Union	
Originated:	2003	
Championship Series:	Army leads with 18 outright championships	
Recent Winner:	Army	
Army (18) 2003 2004 2005 2006 2007 2008 2009 2010 2011 2012 2013 2014 2015 2016 2017 2018 2022 2023	Royal Navy (0)	Royal Air Force (1) 2019
Three Way Ties (0)
Two Way Ties (0)

=== Women's yearly breakdown of results ===
Army victories are shown in ██ red, Royal Navy victories in ██ navy, Royal Air Force victories in ██ light blue. Tied games and tied seasons are shown in ██ white.

Year	Champion	Army – Navy score	Army – RAF score	Navy – RAF score
2003	Army	35-5	Unknown	Unknown
2004	Army	39-3	17-3	7-5
2005	Army	61-5	34-0	10-5
2006	Army	47-7	38-0	13-5
2007	Army	36-3	36-0	17-10
2008	Army	75-0	56-0	23-10
2009	Army	60-0	72-0	36-0
2010	Army	25-11	35-12	14-11
2011	Army	52 - 0	44-10	26-0
2012	Army	41-5	24-7	7-5
2013	Army	54-12	62-0	10-3
2014	Army	64-0	93-3	17-6
2015	Army	65-0	51-10	55-15
2016	Army	74-0	29-7	47-0
2017	Army	95-0	35-26	72-0
2018	Army	72-3	10-0	53-3
2019	RAF	48-3	23-14	67-3
2020-21	No matches played due to COVID-19			
2022	Army	68-0	24-10	32-15
2023	Army	67-5	36-8	17-10
