= William Emslie =

Scotland international rugby union player

- Born: William Duncan Emslie; 3 August 1908 New York, United States
- Died: 7 August 1969 (aged 61) Edinburgh, Scotland

Rugby union career
- Position: Fly-half
Amateur team(s)
Years	Team	Apps	(Points)
- Royal HSFP
Provincial / State sides
Years	Team	Apps	(Points)
- Edinburgh District
International career
Years	Team	Apps	(Points)
1930-32	Scotland	2	(0)

William Emslie (3 August 1908 – 7 August 1969) was a Scotland international rugby union player.

== Rugby Union career ==
=== Amateur career ===
He played for Royal HSFP.

=== Provincial career ===
He was capped for Edinburgh District.

=== International career ===
He was capped 2 times for Scotland.
