= Duncan Robertson (rugby union, born 1851) =

Scottish international rugby union player (1851–1907)

- Born: Duncan Robertson; 30 June 1851
- Died: 29 September 1907 (aged 56)

Rugby union career
- Position: Forward
Amateur team(s)
Years	Team	Apps	(Points)
- Edinburgh Academicals
Provincial / State sides
Years	Team	Apps	(Points)
1873–74	Edinburgh District		
International career
Years	Team	Apps	(Points)
1875	Scotland	1	(0)

Duncan Robertson was a Scotland international rugby football player.

== Rugby Union career ==
=== Amateur career ===
Robertson played for Edinburgh Academicals.

=== Provincial career ===
Robertson played for Edinburgh District in the 1873–74 season.

=== International career ===
He was capped once for Scotland on 8 March 1875.
