= Gala Y.M. RFC =

Scottish rugby union club, based in Galashiels

(Scotland) Gala Y. M. RFC
- Full name: Gala Young Men Rugby Football Club
- Nickname: The YM
- Founded: 1928; 98 years ago
- Location: Galashiels, Scotland
- Ground: Netherdale
- President: Andrew Gould
- Coach: Kevin Andison
- Captain: Rhuary Horsburgh
- League: East Non-League
- 2024–25: East Division 3, withdrew
Team kit

Official website
- www.galaym.co.uk

Gala Y.M. RFC is a rugby union club based in Galashiels, Scotland. The Men's team currently plays in East Non-League.

== History ==
The club was founded in 1928.

== Sides ==
Training is on Thursday nights at 7pm on the back pitches at Netherdale.

== Sevens tournament ==
The club runs the Gala Y.M. Sevens.

== Notable players ==
=== Scotland internationalists ===
The following former Gala Y.M. players have represented Scotland at full international level.

- (Scotland) Norman Bruce

William "the scaff" Brownlee

== Honours ==
=== Men's ===
- Dumfries Sevens
  - Champions (7): 1973, 1978, 1979, 1983, 1985, 1986
- Lasswade Sevens
  - Champions (3): 1956, 1958, 2015
- Haddingon Sevens
  - Champions (8): 1929, 1930, 1931, 1959, 1967, 1979, 1988, 1991
- South of Scotland District Sevens
  - Champions (2): 1984, 1991
- North Berwick Sevens
  - Champions (3): 1963, 1967, 1978
