= Alec Elliot Murray =

Scotland international rugby union player

- Born: 8 October 1923 Shanghai, China
- Died: 24 August 1994 (aged 70) Woking, England
- School: Sedbergh School
- University: Christ Church, Oxford

Rugby union career
- Position: Centre
Amateur team(s)
Years	Team	Apps	(Points)
- Rosslyn Park
- Oxford University
1942	J. E. Thorneloe's XV		
1945-49	London Scottish		
1946	Royal Navy		
International career
Years	Team	Apps	(Points)
1944	Scotland	1	(0)

Alec Elliot Murray (8 October 1923 - 24 August 1994) was a Scotland international rugby union player.

== Rugby Union career ==
=== Amateur career ===
When he moved to England from China, he learned rugby at Sedbergh School.

He played for Rosslyn Park.

He went to Christ Church, Oxford and played rugby union for Oxford University. He also won the 100 yards sprint in 1943, running that distance in 10.3 seconds.

He played for a J. E. Thorneloe's XV in 1942 against the Barbarians.

He played for London Scottish in 1945.

He was picked for the Royal Navy to play against the Army in 1946.

=== International career ===
His father was James Elliot Murray from Scotland.

The Scottish selector G. B. Dryden discovered that Murray was 'an out and out Scot', after watching his matches for Oxford University.

He played for Scotland against England at Murrayfield on 26 February 1944. He was described as "a dashing young player of fine physique who, if fortune favours him, shows promise of becoming another Ian Smith."

He was posthumously awarded his Scotland cap when the SRU decided to give full caps for the Services matches in the Second World War.

== Military career ==
He was a Sub Lieutenant in the Royal Navy. He went on the HMS Victory.
