= William Gibson (rugby union) =

Scotland international rugby union player

- Born: William Ross Gibson; 2 January 1865 Edinburgh, Scotland
- Died: 2 January 1924 (aged 59) Edinburgh, Scotland

Rugby union career
- Position: Forward
Amateur team(s)
Years	Team	Apps	(Points)
- Royal HSFP
Provincial / State sides
Years	Team	Apps	(Points)
- Edinburgh District
-	Cities District		
International career
Years	Team	Apps	(Points)
1891-95	Scotland	14	(0)

William Gibson (2 January 1865 – 2 January 1924) was a Scotland international rugby union player.

== Rugby Union career ==
=== Amateur career ===
He played for Royal HSFP.

=== Provincial career ===
He played for Edinburgh District in their inter-city match against Glasgow District in December 1891.

He played for Cities District against Provinces District in December 1894.

=== International career ===
He was capped fourteen times for Scotland between 1891 and 1895.

== Business career ==
He was a teller in the Commercial Bank of Scotland on George Street, Edinburgh.

== Family ==
His parents were John Gibson and Jane Ross. They had 5 sons including William.

== Death ==
The notice in The Scotsman newspaper stated that Gibson died suddenly.

His funeral took place in the Grange cemetery.

Confirmation to his estate went to his brother and next of kin Thomas Gibson, who was a Writer to the Signet. William Gibson left £1547 and 3 shillings in his estate.
