= Stephen Turk =

- Born: Arthur Stephen Turk; 9 January 1948 Cresswell, Northumberland, England
- Died: 25 August 2005 (aged 57) Langholm, Scotland

Rugby union career
- Position: Centre
Amateur team(s)
Years	Team	Apps	(Points)
-1972	Langholm		
1972-	Army Rugby Union		
1972-	Harrogate		
Provincial / State sides
Years	Team	Apps	(Points)
1970-71	South of Scotland		
-	Yorkshire		
International career
Years	Team	Apps	(Points)
1971	Scotland	1	(0)

Stephen Turk (9 January 1948 - 25 August 2005) is a former Scotland international rugby union player.

== Rugby Union career ==
=== Amateur career ===
He played for Langholm.

He joined the Army, and played for Army Rugby Union; He played in the 1973 Army v Navy game at Twickenham. He also played for the combined services against the All Blacks at Twickenham. Stationed at Catterick then turned out for Harrogate.

=== Provincial career ===
He played for South of Scotland District as a full back in all three matches of their 1970–71 Scottish Inter-District Championship season campaign. The South won every match and finished that season as champions, with Turk the top scorer for the season with 24 points.

On moving to Catterick with the army, he then played for Yorkshire county.

=== International career ===
He was capped by Scotland just the once, against England in 1971, coming on as a replacement at Centre. Scotland won the match, their first win at Twickenham since 1938.

== Death ==
Turk died on the 25 August 2005 after a long illness.
