= Royal Navy Rugby Union =

- Founded: 1907 (first known representative side in 1878)
- Location: HMS Temeraire, Burnaby Road, Portsmouth, PO1 2HB
- President: Vice Admiral Steve Moorhouse
- Most appearances: Dave Pascoe (35 Caps)
1st kit	2nd kit

Official website
- www.navyrugbyunion.co.uk

The Royal Navy Rugby Union (RNRU) was formed in 1907 to administer the playing of rugby union in the Royal Navy. It fields a representative side that competes in the Inter-Service Championship and other competitions most notably the annual Army Navy Match, although a side representing the Royal Navy predates the formation of the union by at least twenty-eight years. The RNRU also has had a number of international players within its representative squads in all forms of the game. In 2011 the RNRU produced its first women's international as well as providing the captain of England VIIs.

== History ==
At the beginning of the twentieth century, a number of service-based clubs existed but found it hard to gain support from service players, because it was considered necessary to turn out for civilian clubs to get first-class games. However, in 1902 the United Services Recreation Ground began to give financial support to the United Services Portsmouth Rugby Football Club to stimulate interest. The club quickly began performing strongly and gained an excellent reputation and equally strong fixture list. The appeal that had been sent out to all naval players to support Service clubs had worked and a definite movement had been made to induce all officers in the Navy to give up playing for civilian clubs. In November 1907 the press were invited to a luncheon where the formation of the Royal Navy Rugby Union was announced. Upon formation the Royal Navy Rugby Union contained many players of international standard. In his book Rugby Football (and how to play it) WJA Davies makes reference to the same point made by Marshall and Tosswill and also makes reference to the formation of the Royal Navy Rugby Union in 1906, however, this chapter contains a number of inaccuracies and it is believed by many that WJA Davies chose the date from the season when the first capped Army Navy match was played, 1906–07. This may have been the source of subsequent confusion as the Royal Navy Rugby Union continued to advertise their formation as 1906 and there were a number of anniversary events over the years, particularly in 2006 when they celebrated their centenary which included a match against the Barbarians FC. A second cause of confusion may have been that the match in February 1907 was a capped game but these caps were awarded retrospectively by the Royal Navy Rugby Union following a meeting held by the Royal Navy Rugby Union in August 1910. In 2006 a project was undertaken to investigate the history of navy rugby and this project uncovered the original minutes as well as various press reports detailing the formation of the Union. The project also had access to private correspondence from the time. In March 2018 the RNRU Executive Committee acknowledged that the evidence pointed to a formation date of November 1907 but decided that despite this they would still use 1906.

The highlight of the RNRU season is the annual Army Navy Match held at Twickenham. The first of these matches took place in 1878 at the Kennington Oval, but it was not until 1907 that the match became an annual fixture as part of the Inter-Service Competition. In 1919, an Inter-Service Championship was arranged by the Army Rugby Union, which included Service teams from Australia, Canada, New Zealand and South Africa, as well as a Royal Air Force Rugby Union team and a British Army team playing under the name 'Mother Country'. The Mother Country and New Zealand Army reached the final at Twickenham, with New Zealand winning the encounter to lift the King's Cup. In 1920 the Army Navy competition was expanded to include the Royal Air Force.

Aside from the Army-Navy match and the Inter Service Championship the various Navy Representative teams (1st XV, U23, Women and Veterans) play in a number of competitions during the season in both the fifteen and seven aside games. There were three knockout cups run exclusively for the ships of the Fleet. These cup competitions were stopped in the early 1990s. In the middle of December there is the final of the RNRU Knockout Cup, open to all Establishments, Ships and Royal Marine Units. The Inverdale Trophy (formerly the Blakeney Cup) is named after a past Life Member of the Royal Navy Rugby Union Surg Capt Inverdale RN. It is competed for annually by the five Commands of the Fleet Air Arm, Plymouth, Portsmouth, Royal Marines and Scotland. The competition has enjoyed many formats and is currently competed for over a week for the right to be called RNRU Command Champions and the opportunity to represent the RNRU at an overseas tournament.

The RNRU is a Constituent Body of the Rugby Football Union and in honouring its role in the evolution of the game in England it has as a mission statement: "To promote, develop, administer and finance rugby football in the Royal Navy throughout the world in support of the Rugby Football Union". This is achieved by financing coaching seminars and courses; administrating the game, and officiating the games through the provision of referees and touch judges.

== Senior XV Cup Competitions ==
The Royal Navy Rugby Union Senior XV players compete annually for five cups as well as playing in the triennial Commonwealth Navies Rugby Cup. The longest cup competition is the annual Army Navy match which is held at Twickenham. The Unions first played each other in 1907. The Royal Navy has played the Royal Air Force annually since 1920 which is also the year that the Inter Service Competition was inaugurated. The Royal Navy annually play the Irish Defence Forces and have done since 2002. The final annual cup match is against the French Navy, the Marine Nationale. The first match was played in 2005 and since 2011 the Royal Navy Rugby Union have awarded caps for this fixture.

The Commonwealth Navies Rugby Cup is a triennial competition that was first played in 1997 where it was held in the UK. Since then it has been played in Australia (twice), New Zealand and also South Africa. The Royal Navy and Royal Australian Navy have competed in every competition. The Royal New Zealand Navy missed the 2018 competition. The South African Navy competed in 2006. The Royal Navy won the first six tournaments with the loss of only one match, to the Royal New Zealand Navy in the 2006 competition. In 2014 the Royal New Zealand Navy were crowned champions on home soil following a 37–10 win over the Royal Navy and a 26–5 win over their Australian counterparts. The last time the competition was played was in 2018 when it was reduced to a single match between the hosts, Royal Navy, and the Royal Australian Navy, which the RN won.

== Women's rugby ==
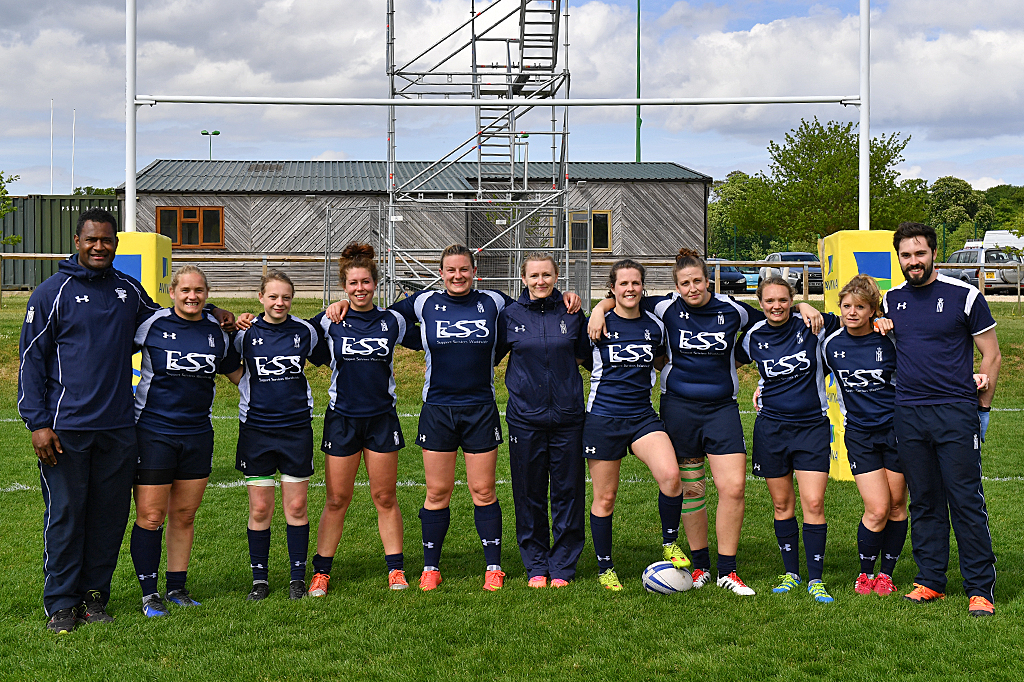
Women's sevens team and coaching staff in 2017

The RNRU fields a women's rugby side, although in the women's Inter-Service competition (introduced in 2003) the Army have been the dominant side, winning every title from 2003 to 2018. In 2019 the RAF Women won the title for the first time.

The Royal Navy Rugby Union started awarding caps from 2011 for the Women's XV with a qualification of six Inter Service matches since 2008. The first player to be awarded a cap under this qualification rule was Vic Percival and at the same match Sophie Roseman, Emma Swinton, Sarah Simms, Sophy Hinds and Pam Williams-Wilson qualified for their first cap. In 2014 the qualifying criteria were altered and the Women were to be awarded their first cap after four Inter Service matches. The four matches had to be since 2009 and to include an appearance in IS2014 or later. This criterion left a couple of players in the hinterland between the old and the new criteria. After the 2014 match v the Royal Air Force Stacey Hargrave became the first to win her cap under the new criteria. The 2015 match against the Marine National Feminines was the first occasion that this game was considered a capped match. At the Annual General Meeting held in November 2017 the criteria were changed for a second time and the award of the Women's cap was brought in to alignment with the men's game (playing in a capped game means receiving a cap without the requirement for any previous matches played). Like the previous change the amendment was not back dated.

The RN(W) players compete for the Roger Sherratt Trophy which is awarded to the member of the Royal Navy Women's Rugby Union Squad who is deemed to be the most valuable player of the season. This player will have shown strong leadership qualities both on and off the field, have provided a positive influence on the Squad and have displayed the attitude and bearing that epitomises the values of the Royal Navy Women Rugby Union Team.

== Caps and Colours ==
The Royal Navy Rugby Union first awarded caps for players of its Senior XV in their matches against the British Army. When the Royal Air Force formed the Inter Services competition in 1920 the Royal Navy Rugby Union also awarded caps for these matches. At the 2010 Annual General Meeting it was decided to award caps to the Senior XV's match against the French Navy, the Marine Nationale, and also for members of the Royal Navy Rugby Union's Women's team for their matches against the British Army and Royal Air Force.

The Royal Navy Rugby Union also award colours to members of their Referee Society on the first occasion that they either referee or are an assistant referee at a match involving the Senior XVs during the Inter Service competition.

== Notable former players ==
=== Scotland internationalists ===
The following former RNRU players have represented Scotland at full international level.

- (Scotland) Bobby Clark
- (Scotland) Drummond Ford
- (Scotland) Wilf Crawford
- (Scotland) Stanley Harper
- (Scotland) Alec Elliot Murray
- (Scotland) Tremayne Rodd
- (Scotland) Alec Valentine
- (Scotland) Alpin Thomson

=== England internationalists ===
The following former RNRU players have represented England at full international level.

- (England) Dave Davies
- (England) Arthur Leyland Harrison
- (England) Cecil Kershaw
- (England) Norman Wodehouse
- (England) Thomas Woods

=== Wales internationalists ===
The following former RNRU player has represented Wales at full international level.

- (Wales) Dewi Bebb
