= Gordon Hunter (rugby union, born 1958) =

Scotland international rugby union player

- Born: Iain Gordon Hunter Hawick, Scotland

Rugby union career
- Position: Scrum-half
Amateur team(s)
Years	Team	Apps	(Points)
- Selkirk
Provincial / State sides
Years	Team	Apps	(Points)
- South of Scotland District
1984	Blues Trial		
1986	Combined Scottish Districts		
International career
Years	Team	Apps	(Points)
1981-84	Scotland 'B'	4	(0)
1984-85	Scotland	4	(0)

Gordon Hunter (born 7 August 1958, in Hawick) is a former Scotland international rugby union player. He played at scrum-half.

== Rugby Union career ==
=== Amateur career ===
Hunter went to Edinburgh's Royal High School but never played for Royal HSFP.

He left Edinburgh and played for Selkirk RFC.

=== Provincial career ===
He played for South of Scotland District.

He played for the Blues Trial side on 7 January 1984.

He played for Combined Scottish Districts on 1 March 1986 against South of Scotland.

=== International career ===
He was capped four times by Scotland 'B' from 1981 to 1984.

He was given four full senior caps for Scotland in the period 1984 to 1985.

He was part of the Scotland squad that won the 1984 Five Nations Championship grand slam.

He played for the Barbarians in 1983.
