= 1926–27 Scottish Districts season =

Rugby union competition

- Countries: Scotland
- Date: 1926–27
- Matches played: 1

The 1926–27 Scottish Districts season is a record of all the rugby union matches for Scotland's district teams.

== History ==
Edinburgh District beat Glasgow District in the Inter-City match.

== Results ==
Date	Try	Conversion	Penalty	Dropped goal	Goal from mark	Notes
1905–1947	3 points	2 points	3 points	4 points	3 points	

=== Inter-City ===
4 December 1926

Glasgow District	9 – 16	Edinburgh District
	Report; Report

New Anniesland

Glasgow District:
Edinburgh District:

=== Other Scottish matches ===
6 November 1926

South-West District	v	South-East District
	Report

Kirkcudbright

South-West District:
South-East District:

20 November 1926

South of Scotland	v	North of Scotland
	Report

Mansfield Park, Hawick
Referee: James Anderson

South of Scotland District:
North of Scotland District:

=== English matches ===
No other District matches played.

=== International matches ===
No touring matches this season.
