= Reginald Maitland =

Scotland international rugby union player

- Born: Reginald Paynter Maitland; 6 March 1851 Southsea, Hampshire, England
- Died: 10 April 1926 (aged 75) Bartley Manor, Hampshire, England

Rugby union career
- Position: Three-Quarters
Amateur team(s)
Years	Team	Apps	(Points)
-	Royal Artillery		
International career
Years	Team	Apps	(Points)
1872	Scotland	1	(0)

Reginald Maitland (6 March 1851 – 10 April 1926) was an English-born Scottish international rugby union player.

== Rugby Union career ==
=== Amateur career ===
He played for the Royal Artillery rugby union side.

=== International career ===
He was called up to the Scotland squad in 1872 and played England at The Oval on 5 February 1872.

== Cricket career ==
Maitland played cricket for Marylebone Cricket Club.

== Army career ==
Maitland served in the Royal Artillery.
