= 1945–46 Scottish Districts season =

Rugby union competition

- Countries: Scotland
- Date: 1945–46
- Matches played: 1

The 1945–46 Scottish Districts season is a record of all the rugby union matches for Scotland's district teams.

== History ==
The Inter-City fixture between Glasgow District and Edinburgh District resumed after the Second World War.

== Results ==
Date	Try	Conversion	Penalty	Dropped goal	Goal from mark	Notes
1905–1947	3 points	2 points	3 points	4 points	3 points	

=== Inter-City ===
1 December 1945

Glasgow District	3 - 36	Edinburgh District
	Preview; Report; Report

Old Anniesland, Glasgow

Glasgow District:
Edinburgh District:

=== Other Scottish matches ===
None. 15 Dec Preview
Report

=== English matches ===
No other District matches played.

=== International matches ===
No touring matches this season.
