= Frederick Maxwell =

Scotland international rugby union player (1849 – 1881)

- Born: Frederick Thomson Maxwell; 10 January 1849 Devonport, England
- Died: 15 January 1881 (aged 32) Secunderabad, India

Rugby union career
- Position: Forward
Amateur team(s)
Years	Team	Apps	(Points)
-	Royal Engineers RFC		
International career
Years	Team	Apps	(Points)
1872	Scotland	1	(0)

Frederick Maxwell (10 January 1849 – 15 January 1881) was a Scottish former international rugby union player who played for the Royal Engineers rugby union side. He was a Forward.

== Rugby union career ==
=== Amateur career ===
Maxwell played rugby for the Royal Engineers.

=== International career ===
He was capped once for Scotland. His sole international appearance came in the second international match in 1872 playing against England at The Oval, London.

== Cricket career ==
Maxwell also played cricket for the Royal Engineers in the period 1869 - 1875
