= Alexander Stewart (rugby union) =

Scottish rugby union player (1852–1945)

- Born: Alexander Kenneth Stewart; 30 August 1852 Mumbai, India
- Died: 13 February 1945 (aged 92) Achnacone, Appin, Scotland

Rugby union career
- Position: Half Back
Amateur team(s)
| Years | Team | Apps | (Points) |
- Edinburgh University
Provincial / State sides
| Years | Team | Apps | (Points) |
| 1873-74 | Edinburgh District | 2 | (0) |
International career
| Years | Team | Apps | (Points) |
| 1874-76 | Scotland | 2 | (0) |

Lieutenant-Colonel Alexander Kenneth Stewart (30 August 1852 – 13 February 1945) was a Scotland international rugby union player who represented Scotland from 1873 to 1875.

== Rugby Union career ==
=== Amateur career ===
Stewart played for Edinburgh University.

=== Provincial career ===
Stewart represented Edinburgh District against Glasgow District in the world's third provincial match, the 'Inter-city', on 6 December 1873.

Stewart next played for the District on 24 January 1874.

=== International career ===
Stewart's international debut was the home match against England in the fixture at The Oval on 23 February 1874.

Stewart's last match for Scotland, also against England, was the fixture at The Oval on 6 March 1876.

== Medical career ==
Stewart earned his medical degree at Edinburgh University and joined the Indian Medical Service.

== Military career ==
While in India, Stewart served with the Poona Horse regiment. He was present at the Siege of Kandahar in 1895, participated in the Chitral Campaign at that same year and took part in the Afghan War in 1897.

== Family ==
Stewart was the head of the Achnacone branch of the Stewart clan, the 12th member of his family to hold that honour. His great-great-grandfather was killed at Culloden. He retired in 1897, after the Afghan War, and remained in his family home of Achnacone. He was made a Deputy Lieutenant and Justice of the Peace for the County of Argyll.
