= Arthur Young (rugby union, born 1855) =

Scotland international rugby union player

- Born: Arthur Henderson Young; 31 October 1855 West Bengal, India
- Died: 20 October 1938 (aged 82) Windsor, England

Rugby union career
- Position: Forward
Amateur team(s)
Years	Team	Apps	(Points)
- Edinburgh Academicals
Provincial / State sides
Years	Team	Apps	(Points)
1874	Edinburgh District		
International career
Years	Team	Apps	(Points)
1874	Scotland	1	(0)

Arthur Young (31 October 1855 – 20 October 1938) was a Scotland international rugby union player.

== Rugby Union career ==
=== Amateur career ===
Young played for Edinburgh Academicals.

=== Provincial career ===
Young played for Edinburgh District on 24 January 1874.

=== International career ===
Young played in one match for Scotland on 23 February 1874. It was against England at The Oval.
