= 1946–47 Scottish Districts season =

Rugby union competition

- Countries: Scotland
- Date: 1946–47
- Matches played: 1

The 1946–47 Scottish Districts season is a record of all the rugby union matches for Scotland's district teams.

== History ==
North play South on 16 November 1946. Edinburgh and South East played a combined Glasgow and West on 23 November 1946.

Edinburgh District beat Glasgow District in the Inter-City match.

Army against a 'Rest of Scotland' side on 15 February 1947.

== Results ==
Date	Try	Conversion	Penalty	Dropped goal	Goal from mark	Notes
1905–1947	3 points	2 points	3 points	4 points	3 points	

=== Inter-City ===
7 December 1946

Glasgow District	9 - 29	Edinburgh District
	Report

Old Anniesland, Glasgow
Referee: J. W. Allan (Melrose)

Glasgow District:
Edinburgh District:

=== Other Scottish matches ===
2 November 1946

Midlands District	-	North of Scotland District

Midlands District:
North of Scotland District:

16 November 1946

North of Scotland District	-	South of Scotland District
	Preview

Aberdeen

North of Scotland District:
South of Scotland District:

=== Junior matches ===
9 November 1946

South of Scotland District	-	Edinburgh District

Peebles

South of Scotland District:
Edinburgh District:

23 November 1946

East of Scotland District	-	West of Scotland District
	Preview

Murrayfield Stadium

East of Scotland District:
West of Scotland District:

=== Trial matches ===
21 December 1946

Blues Trial	21 - 19	Whites Trial
	Preview; Report

Blues Trial:
Whites Trial:

18 January 1947

Scotland Probables	26 - 0	Scotland Possibles
	Report

Probables:
Possibles:

=== English matches ===
15 February 1947

Rest of Scotland	13 - 13	Army Rugby Union
	Report

Attendance: 6000

Rest of Scotland:
Army:

=== International matches ===
No touring matches this season.
