= 1924–25 Scottish Districts season =

Rugby union competition

- Countries: Scotland
- Date: 1924–25
- Matches played: 8

The 1924–25 Scottish Districts season is a record of all the rugby union matches for Scotland's district teams.

== History ==
The District and Trial fixtures for season 1924-25 were reported on 8 May 1924. It was noted that the Glasgow Trial match, between Blues and Whites, normally found in January, was dropped from the fixture list.

North of Scotland District used the Inverness-shire and Ross-shire versus Aberdeenshire match as a trial to determine their selection for the North side. Similarly the Midlands District used the Fifeshire versus Forfarshire match as a trial to determine their selection for the Midlands side.

Glasgow District beat Edinburgh District in the Inter-City match.

The Blues Trial versus Whites Trial match was originally planned to be a Scotland Probables versus Scotland Possibles match. However selection problems caused a number of big name players to miss out; and the match was then deemed a Blues versus Whites trial match instead. The trial match was a strange one; the Whites were winning 12 - nil at half time, scoring 4 unconverted tries in the process. Then the Whites centre pairing of Waddell and Nelson moved into the Blues side for the second half, with the Hawick pair of Bowie and Scott going in the opposite direction. Waddell and Nelson played the match superbly; and got the Blues going in the second half. At the end the Blues had scored 5 tries, with the Whites scoring a solitary try in response in the 2nd half. That made it 5 tries a piece. The Whites conversion misses in the first half came back to haunt the side - the Blues won the match by virtue of 3 conversions to the Whites only conversion scored in the second half.

At the Scotland Probables versus Scotland Possibles match two weeks later, there were a few call offs. D. Drysdale, A. J. Gracie and J. C. H. Ireland could not make the Probables; and G. G. Aitken and D. M. Bertram could not make the Possibles side. That meant that J. C. Dykes and N. Macpherson were promoted to the Probables from the Possibles; and J. Gray took Drysdale's full back slot.

== Results ==
Date	Try	Conversion	Penalty	Dropped goal	Goal from mark	Notes
1905–1947	3 points	2 points	3 points	4 points	3 points	

=== Inter-City ===
6 December 1924

Glasgow District	28 – 6	Edinburgh District
	Report; Report

New Anniesland, Glasgow
Attendance: 8,500
Referee: Willie Burnet (Hawick)

Glasgow District: J. Gray (West of Scotland), T. R. Murray (Glasgow Academicals), J. C. Dykes (Glasgow Academicals), R. C. Warren (Glasgow Academicals), W. M. Simmers (Glasgow Academicals), H. Waddell (Glasgow Academicals), J. B. Nelson (Glasgow Academicals), J. M. Bannerman (Glasgow HSFP), W. S. Dobson (Glasgow Academicals), J. Gilchrist (Glasgow Academicals), J. C. H. Ireland (Glasgow HSFP), J. S. McLachlan (West of Scotland), A. K. Stevenson (Glasgow Academicals), W. H. Stevenson (Glasgow Academicals), J. B. White (Glasgow Academicals)
Edinburgh District: D. Drysdale (Heriots), T. S. Roxburgh (Watsonians), R. M. Kinnear (Heriots), T. Gow Brown (Heriots), J. H. Carmichael (Watsonians), D. P. Henshaw (Watsonians), J. A. R. Selby (Watsonians), A. A. D. Eunson (Heriots), J. Greenshields (Heriots), D. S. Kerr (Heriots), A. K. Mann (Edinburgh Wanderers), J. Moffat (Edinburgh Academicals), J. W. Scott (Stewarts College F. P.), H. G. Taylor (Watsonians), J. P. Thomson (Watsonians)

=== Other Scottish matches ===
8 November 1924

Inverness-shire and Ross-shire	11 - 36	Aberdeenshire
	Report

Inverness
Referee: W. G. Falconer

Inverness-shire and Ross-shire:
Aberdeenshire:

8 November 1924
2.45pm

Fifeshire	23 - 5	Forfarshire
	Preview; Report; Report; Report

Kirkcaldy

Fifeshire:
Forfarshire:

15 November 1924

North of Scotland District	11 – 9	Midlands District
Try: R. Findlay; J.T. Sorley; R. Sutherland; Con: J. W. L. Bain	Preview; Report	Try: B. Allan; Dr. Reid penalty try

St. Machar Drive, Aberdeen
Referee: John Dallas

North of Scotland District: C. E. Saunders (Aberdeen GSFP), R. Findlay and J. Horsburgh (Aberdeen University), B. Esslemont (Aberdeen GSFP), R. Sutherland (Gordonians), J. T. Sorley and R. I. Cruickshank (Aberdeen GSFP), Menzies (Ross-shire), Wishart (Aberdeen University), J. MacLeod and Bain (Aberdeen GSFP), W. S. Law (Gordonians), Hastilow (Highland), Johnston (Elgin), Mackintosh Walker (Highland)
Midlands District: S. Laurie (St. Andrews University), J. Cairns and Jenkins (Dunfermline), Williamson (St. Andrews University), Halley (Panmure), J. Black and Wilson (Dunfermline), Bob Howie (Kirkcaldy), Dr. Reid (Dunfermline), F. Sharp (Panmure), B. Allan (Howe of Fife), G. Maxwell (Panmure), Henderson (Perthshire), J. McInnnes (Howe of Fife), McIntosh (Kirkcaldy)

22 November 1924

North of Scotland District	–	South of Scotland District

North of Scotland District:
South of Scotland District:

=== Junior matches ===
28 February 1925

South of Scotland District	–	Edinburgh District

Peebles

South of Scotland District:
Edinburgh District:

=== Trial matches ===
15 December 1924

Blues Trial	21 - 17	Whites Trial
Try: H. Waddell; J. C. Dykes; J. S. McLachlan x 2 J. B. Nelson; Con: J. S. McLachlan x 3	Preview; Report; Report	Try: I. S. Smith x 2 J. B. Nelson; A. C. Gillies; L. M. Stuart; Con: A. C. Gillies

The Greenyards, Melrose
Attendance: 3,800
Referee: A. W. Angus (SRU)

Blues Trial: A. S. Dykes (Glasgow Academicals), J. McLaren (Glasgow HSFP), T. R. Murray (Glasgow Academicals), R. M. Kinnear (Heriots F.P.), J. C. Dykes (Glasgow Academicals), P. Scott (Hawick), A. Bowie (Hawick), W. Moffat (Hawick), D. S. Davies (Hawick), J. Graham (Kelso), R. Howie (Kirkcaldy), J. S. McLachlan (West of Scotland), D. J. McMyn (Cambridge), J. W. Scott (Stewart's College F. P.), J. B. White (Glasgow Academicals) - H. Waddell (Glasgow Academicals) and J. B. Nelson (Glasgow Academicals) played for the Blues in the second half.
Whites Trial: T. Waddell (Gala), I. S. Smith (Oxford), W. M. Simmers (Glasgow Academicals), G. M. Boyd (Glasgow HSFP), C. R. Harman (London Scottish), H. Waddell (Glasgow Academicals), J. B. Nelson (Glasgow Academicals), J. Gilchrist (Glasgow Academicals), A. C. Gillies (Carlisle), J. C. H. Ireland (Glasgow HSFP), J. Montador (Birkenhead Park), J. Paterson (Birkenhead Park), W. B. Scott (Cambridge), W. H. Stevenson (Glasgow Academicals), L. M. Stuart (Glasgow HSFP) - P. Scott (Hawick) and A. Bowie (Hawick) played for the Whites in the second half.

27 December 1924

Scotland Probables	27 - 3	Scotland Possibles
Try: Smith x 5 Wallace; Waddell; Con: J. C. Dykes; Gillies x 2	Preview; Report	Pen: Stuart

Murrayfield Stadium
Attendance: 8,000
Referee: A. A. Lawrie (SRU)

Probables: J. Gray (West of Scotland), A. C. Wallace (Oxford University), J. C. Dykes (Glasgow Academicals), G. P. S. Macpherson (Oxford University), I. Smith (Oxford University), H. Waddell (Glasgow Academicals), J. B. Nelson (Glasgow Academicals), J. M. Bannerman (Glasgow HSFP), J. C. R. Buchanan (Stewart's College F. P.), D. S. Davies (Hawick), A. C. Gillies (Watsonians), R. Howie (Kirkcaldy), J. S. Maclachlan (West of Scotland), D. J. McMyn (Cambridge University), N. Macpherson (Newport) - Stevenson, Paterson, J. W. Scott, Stuart, Douty, A. S. Dykes all played for the Probables in the second half.
Possibles: A. S. Dykes (Glasgow Academicals), T. R. Murray (Glasgow Academicals), W. M. Simmers (Glasgow Academicals), J. A. S. Coutts (London Scottish), R. K. Millar (London Scottish), Gow Brown (Heriots F. P.), P. S. Douty (Cambridge University), W. S. Dobson (Glasgow Academicals), J. Gilchrist (Glasgow Academicals), J. Graham (Kelso), J. R. Paterson (Birkenhead Park), J. W. Scott (Stewart's College F. P.), W. B. Scott (Cambridge University), W. H. Stevenson (Glasgow Academicals), L. M. Stuart (Glasgow HSFP) - Maclachlan, Howie, Davies, Macpherson, Nelson, Gray all played for the Possibles in the second half.

=== English matches ===
No other District matches played.

=== International matches ===
No touring matches this season.
