= 1923–24 Scottish Districts season =

Rugby union competition

- Countries: Scotland
- Date: 1923–24
- Matches played: 1

The 1923–24 Scottish Districts season is a record of all the rugby union matches for Scotland's district teams.

== History ==
Edinburgh District drew with Glasgow District in the Inter-City match.

== Results ==
Date	Try	Conversion	Penalty	Dropped goal	Goal from mark	Notes
1905–1947	3 points	2 points	3 points	4 points	3 points	

=== Inter-City ===
1 December 1923

Glasgow District	5 – 5	Edinburgh District
	Report

New Anniesland, Glasgow
Referee: Willie Burnet (Hawick)

Glasgow District:
Edinburgh District:

=== Other Scottish matches ===
17 November 1923
2.30pm

Midlands District	6 – 5	North of Scotland District
Try: Sharp; Syme	Report	Try: Walker; Con: Dudgeon

Forthill, Dundee
Referee: G. Falconer

Midlands District: G. L. Patullo (Panmure), W. .T. Webster (Panmure), J. Lindsay (Howe of Fife), A. Wighton (Dundee H.S.), J. A. Williamson (St Andrews), and R. Kinnison (St Andrews); T. Syme (Dundee H.S.) and Bob Howie (Kirkcaldy); W. G. K. Finlay (Perth), S. C. Sharp (Panmure), J Wright (St Andrews), A. A. Marr (Panmure), D. H. Cameron (Dundee H.S.), E. Simpson (Dunfermline), and J. H. S. Davidson (Howe of Fife).
North of Scotland District: J. Dudgeon (Ross-shire); D. Macgregor (Aberdeen Grammar School F.P.'s), C. E. Saunders (Aberdeen Grammar F.P.'s), K. I. G. Matheson (Highland), and K. Watson (Aberdeen University); W. Dudgeon (Ross-shire) and J. R. Cruickshank (Aberdeenshire); E. Grant (Highland) and C. A. MacLennan (Highland); Henderson (Ross-shire), A. Reid (Elgin), Lawie (Aberdeen University), Low (Gordonians), G. McLeod (Aberdeen Grammar F.P.'s), and Ingram (Aberdeenshire).

24 November 1923

North of Scotland District	–	South of Scotland District
	Report; Report

North of Scotland District:
South of Scotland District:

15 March 1924

Edinburgh District	–	South of Scotland District

Edinburgh District:
South of Scotland District:

=== Trial matches ===
22 December 1923

Scotland Probables	6 - 10	Scotland Possibles
	Preview; Preview; Preview; Report; Report

Inverleith
Attendance: 10,000
Referee: A. A. Lawrie (SRU)

Probables:
Possibles:

19 January 1924

Scotland Probables	33 - 0	Scotland Possibles
	Preview; Report; Report; Report

New Anniesland, Glasgow
Attendance: 5,000
Referee: J. McGill (SRU)

Probables:
Possibles:

=== English matches ===
No other District matches played.

=== International matches ===
No touring matches this season.
