= 1913–14 Scottish Districts season =

Rugby union competition

- Countries: Scotland
- Date: 1913–14
- Matches played: 1

The 1913–14 Scottish Districts season is a record of all the rugby union matches for Scotland's district teams.

== History ==
Glasgow District and Edinburgh District drew in the Inter-City match, each scoring 1 drop goal.

== Results ==
Date	Try	Conversion	Penalty	Dropped goal	Goal from mark	Notes
1905–1947	3 points	2 points	3 points	4 points	3 points	

=== Inter-City ===
6 December 1913

Glasgow District	4 - 4	Edinburgh District
	Report

Hamilton Crescent, Glasgow
Attendance: 3,000
Referee: John Dallas

Glasgow District:
Edinburgh District:

=== Other Scottish matches ===
27 December 1913

Provinces District	v	Anglo-Scots
	Preview; Report

Inverleith

Provinces:
Anglo-Scots: [

=== Trial matches ===
10 January 1914

Blues Trial	v	Whites Trial
	Preview; Report

Inverleith

Blues Trial:
Whites Trial: [

=== English matches ===
No other District matches played.

=== International matches ===
No touring matches this season.
