= Bob Howie =

British Lions & Scotland international rugby union player

- Born: Robert. A. Howie; 11 June 1898 Gorebridge, Scotland
- Died: 14 May 1992 (aged 93)
- Occupation: Rugby union referee

Rugby union career
- Position: Prop
Amateur team(s)
Years	Team	Apps	(Points)
- Kirkcaldy
Provincial / State sides
Years	Team	Apps	(Points)
1923-24	Midlands District		
International career
Years	Team	Apps	(Points)
1924	British and Irish Lions	4	(0)
1924-25	Scotland	7	(0)
Refereeing career
Years	Competition		Apps
1928	Scottish Districts		

Robert Howie (11 June 1898 – 14 May 1992) was a Scotland international rugby union player. He played for Kirkcaldy RFC.

== Rugby Union career ==
=== Amateur career ===
He played for Kirkcaldy RFC.

=== Provincial career ===
Howie was capped by Midlands District.

=== International career ===
He was capped seven times as a prop forward for Scotland between 1924 and 1925. and was selected for the 1924 British Lions tour to South Africa, playing in four tests.

=== Referee career ===
He refereed the Inter-City match between Glasgow District and Edinburgh District in 1928.

== Family ==
Bob Howie was the brother of Dave Howie, who also played for Kirkcaldy and gained seven national caps, but died in the First World War.

Although he and his brother gained fourteen caps between them their father, a grim farmer, never watched them once, saying:

"Rugby an' fermin' will no agree, an' A ken which'll pit mair money in yer pooch."
