= 1928–29 Scottish Districts season =

Rugby union competition

- Countries: Scotland
- Date: 1928–29
- Matches played: 1

The 1928–29 Scottish Districts season is a record of all the rugby union matches for Scotland's district teams.

== History ==
Edinburgh District drew with Glasgow District in the Inter-City match.

The Dundee Courier of 8 November 1928 ran a damning assessment of the inter-district fixtures this season:

RUGBY TRIALS AND THEIR PURPOSE Leading Up to the New Game with " Anglos " By TOUCH JUDGE. Quit© an imposing programme of representative matches is being carried through in Scotland this season, but what exactly is the object of it all? Are these games just what they are called, " representative," or do they fulfil any more serious purpose connected with the discovery and advancement of players for the present or future use of the international team? So far as the games in which the North of Scotland (including the Midlands) is concerned it is possible to say that they aro trials, i.©., they are more than merely inter-district games with no higher object in view. There logic in the sequence, . Angus v. Fife, Aberdeen v. Highlands, North v. Midlands, North v. West, and finally North and South v. Anglo-Scots, the important new trial inaugurated this season, which is to be played at Galashiels on December 22. But apart from the North there appears be no consistency about the system. The West Counties are this season for the first time to have a game all themselves against the North, which will presumably act as a preliminary trial for the Glasgow end of the Junior Inter-City, but the juniors in and around Edinburgh are not given any similar try-out. In the South. In the South the position is worse than in Edinburgh, for there games are played which apparently lead nowhere. Last Saturday Roxburghshire met Selkirkshire, and the select of these counties will represent the South against the South'-West (Dumfries, Stranraer, &c.) at Dumfries this week. Will the South selectors see this game? No! Their representatives, with their minds made up, are to be at Dunfermline to see the North, and afterwards co-operate with the North delegates in the selection of the combined Norih and South side to meet the Anglos six weeks later. Hard on South-West. Leaving aside the absurdity of selecting team to play after such an interval, during which vagaries of individual form may render it utterly unrepresentative or injuries may entirely alter its composition, Edwards, of Leeds United, who oaptained the victorious English League eleven. it appears to me that less than justice is likely to be meted out to any players from the South-West who may distinguish themselves at Dumfries. It is, for example, conceivable that Stranraer might be able to give the South as good forward Ross-sfiire has given the North in A. T. Cameron, but unless the telephone is busier than I anticipate on Saturday evening won't get farther than Dumfries. all want every man who is worthy of trial—whatever airt he hails from —to receive his due. And there is nothing inherently impossible in Stranraer or the Stewartry being able to provide Scotland with, say, a forward —for polished backs are not found in the outposts. The Dunfermline Game. Coming to this game on Saturday in which are immediately interested, I can hardly see any other result than a substantial victory for the North. is never wise policy to underrate a foe, especially ono whose calibre is to iargc extent unkrown, but as six of the West Counties side are drawn from Allan Glen's F.P.s we get a general indication of their probable strength from the fact that Dunfermline defatted that club by 33 points to 9. To many people this part of the country the title West Counties may not convey very much. From an examination of the clufcrs from which the team is drawn it appears that the West Counties embrace the clubs which take part in the Western District championship, that is to say, all the clubs in Glasgow and the West of Scotland apart from the strictly senior clubs in the city itself and Greenock Wanderers. As these clubs are, so far as I can judge from some pre-war experience of Rugby in the West, on very much the same plane the clubs in the Midlands, it may seem rather optimistic to anticipate a decisive victory for the North team, but I fully expect that the West will be inferior everywhere except possibly at full back. Midland " Probables." Without having first-hand knowledge the ith players it is, of course, impossible accurately to forecast what form the combined side will take, but I extremely hopeful that Alan Wilson and Harry Lmd will the halfbacks, that A. W. Wilson and C. H. Brown will form the left wing, and that G. Ritchie, A. C. Bain, and either A. T. Cameron or N. Begg (preferably the first-named) will find places in the pack. The allotting of Saturday's game to Dunfermline a recognition of the place the Fifeshire club has won,_ and, in view of the increasing support which the club commanding it is expected that there will be a good attendance. The kick-off is at 2.45, and Dr G. W. Simpson, of the S.R.U., will referee.

== Results ==
Date	Try	Conversion	Penalty	Dropped goal	Goal from mark	Notes
1905–1947	3 points	2 points	3 points	4 points	3 points	

=== Inter-City ===
1 December 1928

Glasgow District	18 – 18	Edinburgh District
	Report

Old Anniesland
Attendance: 12,000
Referee: Bob Howie

Glasgow District:
Edinburgh District:

=== Other Scottish matches ===
10 November 1928

North of Scotland District	34 - 3	West Counties
	Preview; Report

McKane Park
Referee: G. W. Simpson (SRU)

North of Scotland District:
West Counties:

22 December 1928

Provinces District	v	Anglo-Scots
	Preview

Netherdale

Provinces District:
Anglo-Scots:

=== Junior matches ===
10 November 1928

South-West District	v	South of Scotland District
	Report

South-West District:
South of Scotland District:

17 November 1928

Edinburgh District	6-4	Glasgow District
	Report

Edinburgh District:
Glasgow District:

=== Trial matches ===
5 January 1929

Scotland Probables	v	Scotland Possibles
	Preview

Murrayfield Stadium

Scotland Probables:
Scotland Possibles:

=== English matches ===
No other District matches played.

=== International matches ===
No touring matches this season.
