= Royal HSFP =

Defunct Scottish rugby union club, based in Edinburgh

- Full name: Royal High School Former Players Rugby Football Club
- Unions: SRU
- Founded: 1868 (original club); 2017 (reformed club)
- Disbanded: 2003; 23 years ago (original club) (merged to form Corstorphine RFC)
- Ground: Barnton
- Director of Rugby: Kenneth Harper-Zulu
- Coach: Kenneth Harper-Zulu
- League: East Division 2
- 2025-26: Disqualified
Team kit

Royal High School Former Pupils is a rugby union club based in Edinburgh, Scotland. Royal HSFP was a founder member of the Scottish Rugby Union, the second oldest national governing body in the world.

The original club was disbanded in 2003 when it merged with Corstorphine RFC but the merged club Royal High Corstorphine broke back into two clubs in 2017. These new clubs were known as Corstorphine Cougars and Barnton RFC.

Barnton RFC was the start of an attempt to revive the old Royal HSFP side. The club is now known as "Royal High RFC".

== History ==
=== School ===
The Royal High School is a school in Edinburgh with origins traceable to the 12th c at the Abbey of Holyrood, subsequently run by the City of Edinburgh. The school gives its name to High School Yards off Infirmary Street, where it was located before moving to the familiar Thos. Hamilton classical Greek building on Calton Hill at Regent Road which it occupied until July 1968, when it moved to new premises at East Barnton Avenue in the western side of Edinburgh near Davidson's Mains. Coeducation commenced in Sept 1976 and the school remains the Local Authority school for that area to date. The history is documented by Ross in a definitive work, William C. A. Ross, the Royal High School (Edinburgh: Oliver and Boyd, 1934)

=== Rugby Union in the school ===
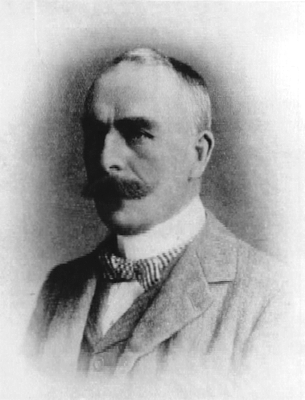
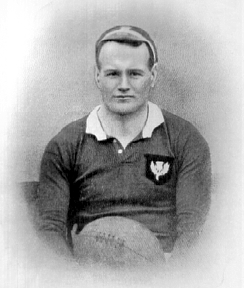
Left: Nat Watt, captain from 1880 to 1884; right: Mark Coxon Morrison, international for Scotland and the British Lions

The Royal High School was playing a form of "football" by 1810 (the word "football" here referring to a handling code, rather than one like soccer). The Royal High played the first inter-school match with Merchiston in 1858.

The Royal High School's rugby club was formed in 1868. These clubs were pioneered by former and attending pupils, who originally played their games together. Among the celebrated student founders of cricket and rugby football at the school were Taverner Knott and Nat Watt, who undertook their labours with the encouragement of Thomson Whyte, reportedly the first master to take a serious interest in sport at the school.

The sporting clubs were formally integrated into the school body when, in 1900, at the request of the club captains, two masters undertook the management of cricket and rugby.

=== Foundation of Former Pupils side ===
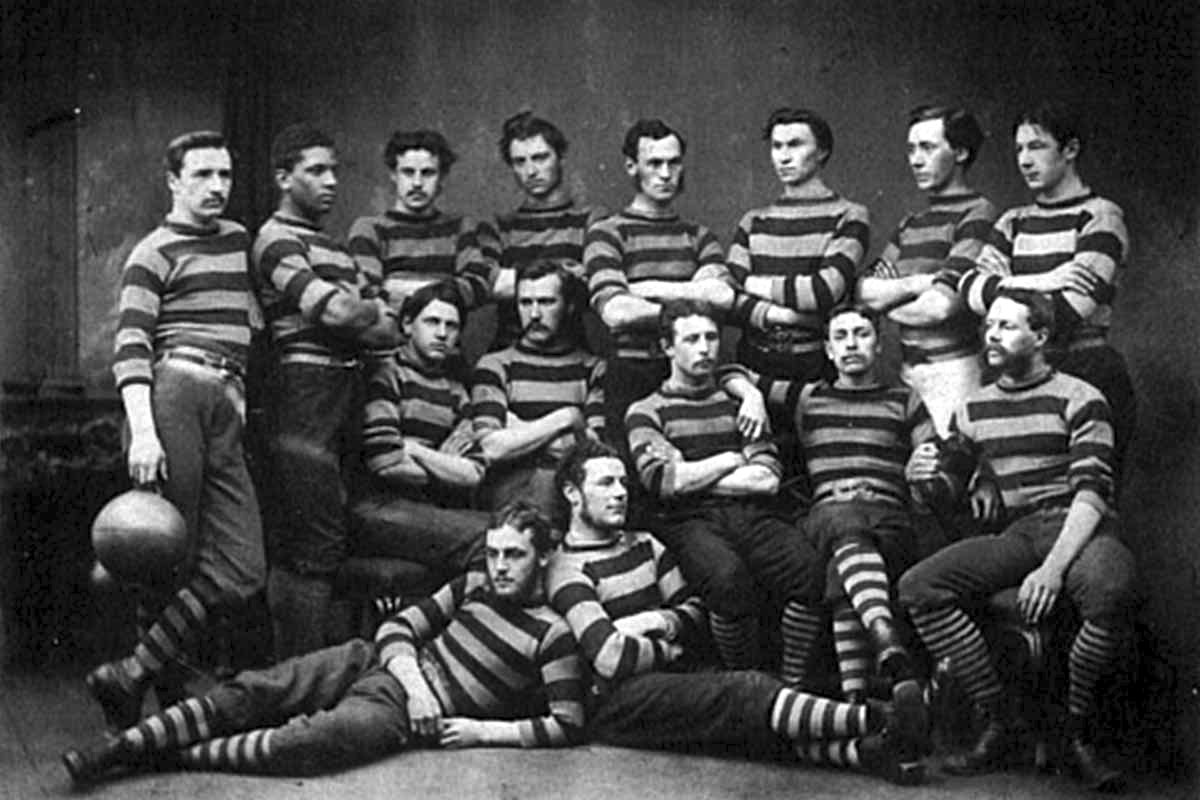
RHS team of 1871

The Royal High School Former Pupils club was formally organised in 1868, and was a founder member of the Scottish Football Union (future SRU) in 1873.

That Act of Council in 1851, which freed our Saturdays, should be held in high esteem by all our athletes, for it is the Magna Carta of our Cricket and Football Clubs. It rendered possible the formation of a Cricket Club in 1861, to be followed seven years later by a Football Club.

Historically, RHSFP was much stronger, and produced players such as Mark Coxon Morrison (sometimes considered the best Scottish captain ever, and a member of the Scottish Sports Hall of Fame), and Pringle Fisher.

Mark Morrison was capped 1896, and went to win twenty-three caps. Angus Buchanan of Royal High School FP, was the first person to score a try in international rugby.

"Royal High, also a force in the nineteenth century, have had a similar history. They have continued to produce good players, but seldom good teams. They had a brief spell in the First Division, but never looked like establishing themselves. In recent years, the link between school and club has been broken... Royal H.S.F.P. have recently found difficulty in retaining the best players to come out of the Royal High School. Neither Colin Telfer nor Gordon Hunter ever played for them, though both worked in Edinburgh; Ivan Tukalo left Royal High for Selkirk in the summer of 1983 after the club lost its First Division place."(Massie)

Royal HSFP hosted its first rugby sevens tournament in 1920.

Bill McLaren recalls being chosen for a Scottish XV against the British Army for a game at Murrayfield on 15 February 1947, which contained two RHSFP players: T.P.L. Tom M'Glashan and D.T. McLean. Tom M'Glashan, was being still selected for Scotland in 1954, as the front row of a pack which contained three Macs, the others being Hugh McLeod and Robert MacEwen.

=== Merger ===
The club merged with Corstorphine RFC in 2003 to form Royal High Corstorphine RFC. However, the merger was short-lasting and the new club itself broke up in 2017.

=== Barnton RFC ===
A new club was formed from the old RHC Cougars side and given associate membership by the Scottish Rugby Union. Barnton RFC is an attempt to revive the Royal HSFP club. The club was then rebranded under the similar name "Royal High RFC".

== Grounds ==
Due to the historic association with the Abbey of Holyrood, the school had the use of two pitches at Holyrood, adjacent to the Place of Holyroodhouse and conveniently situated beneath the school on Regent Road. Five rugby pitches were maintained at Jock's Lodge, where the RHS 'Preparatory Department' was relocated in the 1930s. On relocation to Barnton in 1968, pitches were then available adjacent to the new building. Jock's Lodge is located on the east side of the city, on the opposite side from the school's present location. This put them in competition with Portobello RFC, Musselburgh, Leith and Trinity Academicals for local talent.

== Notable players ==
=== Scotland internationalists ===
The following former Royal HSFP players have represented Scotland at full international level.

- (Scotland) Alexander Petrie
- (Scotland) Thomas McGlashan
- (Scotland) Iwan Tukalo
- (Scotland) William Gibson
- (Scotland) Roger Davidson
- (Scotland) Alexander Wood
- (Scotland) Duncan MacLean
- (Scotland) Jack Park
- (Scotland) Angus Buchanan
- (Scotland) Pringle Fisher
- (Scotland) Mark Coxon Morrison
- (Scotland) William Emslie
- (Scotland) William Penman
- (Scotland) William Ferguson

=== Edinburgh District ===
The following former Royal HSFP players have represented Edinburgh District at provincial level.

- (Scotland) James Robertson
- (Scotland) J. Junor
- (Scotland) Alexander Petrie
- (Scotland) M. Sanderson
- (Scotland) Alexander Wood
- (Scotland) G. F. Raynor
- (Scotland) Angus Buchanan
- (Scotland) William Emslie

=== British and Irish Lions ===
The following former Royal HSFP players have represented the British and Irish Lions.

- (Scotland) Mark Coxon Morrison

== Honours ==
- Langholm Sevens
  - Champions (3): 1949, 1953, 1960
- Melrose Sevens
  - Champions (3): 1921, 1934, 1961
- Hawick Sevens
  - Champions (3): 1914, 1938, 1962
- Gala Sevens
  - Champions (1): 1919
- Jed-Forest Sevens
  - Champions (2): 1907, 1947
- Peebles Sevens
  - Champions (2): 1946, 1975
- Broughton Sevens
  - Champions (1): 2022

== SRU presidents ==
Former Royal High players have been President of the SRU:

- 1879–80 Angus Buchanan
- 1881–82 Alexander Petrie
- 1902–03 Roger Davidson

== Bibliography ==
- Bath, Richard (ed.) The Scotland Rugby Miscellany (Vision Sports Publishing Ltd, 2007 ISBN 1-905326-24-6)
- Godwin, Terry Complete Who's Who of International Rugby (Cassell, 1987, ISBN 0-7137-1838-2)
- Ironside, Robert & Thorburn, Alexander M.C. Thorburn, Royal High School Rugby Football Club: Centenary 1868-1968 (Edinburgh, Royal High School, 1968)
- Jones, J.R. Encyclopedia of Rugby Football (Robert Hale, London, 1958)
- Massie, Allan A Portrait of Scottish Rugby (Polygon, Edinburgh; ISBN 0-904919-84-6)
- Ross, William C. A. The Royal High School (Edinburgh, Oliver and Boyd, 1934)
