= Drumchapel RFC =

Defunct Scottish rugby union club, based in Glasgow

(Scotland) Drumchapel RFC
- Full name: Drumchapel Rugby Football Club
- Founded: c.1905
- Disbanded: 1914; 112 years ago
- Location: Glasgow
- Ground(s): Thirdpart, Yoker.
- Captain: W.S. McLeod
Team kit

Drumchapel RFC was an early twentieth-century East Dunbartonshire-based rugby union club; the town – after being annexed in 1938 – now resides in Glasgow.

== History ==
=== Sporting beginnings ===
In the early nineteenth century, the New Kilpatrick district of Drumchapel was traditionally geared towards farming and mining. The most common sport played was the farmers' ploughing match; other sports only getting formally played at the annual agricultural shows. The population was spread between the village, the Peel Glen mining rows, the hamlet of Townhead and the ancient baronies of Garscadden and Drumry.

This rural idyll changed with the introduction of a railway station to Drumchapel in 1891. Almost immediately afterwards Drumchapel became sought after as a commuter village to Glasgow. It was still regarded as 'a pretty place' for day trips and its population rapidly grew. Sports like rugby union, football, golf and tennis took over from the ploughing matches. Drumchapel FC were holding open days to attract players at the end of 1896; and were notably open on New Years Day 1897. Neighbouring athletic clubs regularly ran courses through Drumchapel. By the onset of the First World War the population of Drumchapel village alone was around 750 people.

=== Formation of the rugby club ===
It is not known the precise date of the formation of the club; but it is likely rugby must have been played in Drumchapel before the turn of the twentieth century. A Drumchapel youngster, a W. Finnigan, is noted as winning a juvenile place-kicking tournament at a Knightswood Brass Band event on 24 June 1896. He kicked the furthest with a distance of 128 feet and 8 inches.

One of the first instances noted of Drumchapel RFC was the match on 30 September 1905; when the Drumchapel side played a second XV of Hillhead HSFP.

=== Ground ===
The club played its matches at Thirdpart in the neighbouring village of Yoker. Thirdpart is now the site of Peterson Park; the home of the Glasgow Mid Argyll shinty side.

== Towards the Championship title ==
Until they joined a formal league Drumchapel had to negotiate their own fixtures. Fortunately, many top national championship sides had 2XV and 3XV sides desperate to play; and invitational sides like Rowans Engineers and A. Brown's XV - the Midlands side run by the Cupar RFC player A. J. G. Brown - filled the void.

The Drumchapel team rapidly improved season by season. At the start of the 1907–08 season Charles Stuart, C. L. Vermont, T. Inglis and C. H. Stewart stood out in a game against Hillhead HSFP 2XV. Stuart would later represent Scotland and Inglis would represent the League.

Glasgow Rangers came calling for Charles Stuart to offer a professional football contract; but Charles' father Charles Douglas Stuart senior, an old Royal HSFP player, instead enrolled his son with Uddingston RFC; that bit further from Glasgow.

=== Western Junior League ===
Just below the national championship league were regional leagues classed as 'junior' leagues; the Western Junior League made up of West of Scotland teams was one such regional league.

==== Tough start ====
Drumchapel entered the new Western Junior League in 1908. They were up against Old Larchfieldians, Stirling HSFP, Bellahouston Academicals FP, Lenzie, Kilmarnock, Bishopbriggs, Falkirk and Uddingston.

The improvement was noted on the opening league day of the 1908–09 season; Drumchapel were beaten away by Bellahouston Academicals at Norwood by a slender 3 points; but it was reported that they were due at least a draw from the match; that they didn't have all their usual first team players in the matchday squad; and that Bellahouston had won last year's match at Thirdpart by 20 points. However, despite seeing an improvement in performances, the side ended up bottom of the table – from 12 league matches played, they recorded only 2 wins, 2 draws and the rest were losses. The Helensburgh side Old Larchfieldians won the league with 9 matches played, all won; their match with Drumchapel resulting in a tight 9–8 win.

==== Champions ====
The improvements in performance over that first league season helped drive local participation and Drumchapel RFC had enough players to make up three sides the following season (1909–10). In December 1909 the rugby club had a successful Café-chantant fundraiser in the Academy Rooms in Partick which raised £40. The 1st team won the Western Junior league title in season 1909–10.

== Building on success ==
In the off season, before the new season campaign of 1910–11, the club built a new pavilion at Thirdpart. This was noted to particularly help the comfort of visiting teams.

Opening the pavilion, on 24 September 1910, were Drumchapel's usual pre-season fixture side, Rowans Engineers. The Engineers side were an invitational side run by former Drumchapel player (and then West of Scotland player and Scotland international) Charles Stuart. Nicknamed 'the black squad', the Rowans side that day was:-

D. Dunlop (Glasgow Academicals), J. Murray-Campbell (West of Scotland). Val. Reid (Clydesdale), T. W. Rutherford (Glasgow University), and R. McNaught (Uddingston); W. Ross (Bearsden), and J. L. Bowman (Clydesdale); Charles Stuart (capt.) (West of Scotland), T. E. Campbell (West of Scotland), E. W. Izard (West of Scotland), W. M. Biggart (Clydesdale), W. Smith (Moseley), J. D. Stuart (Uddingston), D. Duncan (Uddingston), and J. W. Reid (Uddingston).

The fixtures of 1910–11 season were roughly the same as last year's Championship season but with the added novelty of two Edinburgh sides.

The 1911–12 season saw the club able to tour to Carlisle and one of the Border teams. The club has a committee and the Head Coach and captain is named as W. S. McLeod. The club secretary is given as S.A. Longmoor c/o White Street in Partick. There was no preseason fixture against Rowan Engineers as Charles Stuart went abroad. A preseason holiday match with Aberdeen GSFP was the alternative.

As Drumchapel strengthened other sides began poaching their players. A. A. Cruickshank was signed by Hillhead HSFP for the start of the 1912–13 season. Drumchapel's half-back R. Cuthbertson made the front page of The Scottish Referee, a sports newspaper, as a player to watch for the season.

The 1913–14 season saw Clydesdale sign some of the best Drumchapel players for their 1st team's bid for the Scottish national championship. This is yet another indicator of Drumchapel's rise on the rugby stage; in 1906 the Thirdpart side was pitched against Clydesdale's 4th team.

== Selected matches ==
Matches reported in newspapers. Only 1st team matches shown. Drumchapel try-scorers noted where given.

Year	Date	Opponent	Venue	Result	Score	Notes
1905-06 season
1905	30 September	Hillhead HSFP 2XV	Thirdpart	Loss	6–8	
1905	21 October	Hillhead HSFP 2XV	Thirdpart			
1905	25 November	Old Larchfieldians 2XV	Helensburgh			
1905	2 December	Cambuslang 2XV	Greenlees Farm	Win	17-0	
1905	9 December	Lenzie 2XV	Lenzie	Win	5-3	
1905	23 December	Bearsden 2XV	Dougalston			
1906	20 January	Glasgow Academicals 3XV	Thirdpart			
1906	27 January	Stanley House HSFP	Bridge of Allan	Loss	0–6	
1906	10 March	Hillhead HSFP 2XV	Scotstoun			
1906-07 season
1906	13 October	Stirling HSFP 2XV	Williamfield	Win	21-10	
1906	27 October	Hillhead HSFP 2XV	Thirdpart			
1906	3 November	Uddingston RFC	Birkenshaw Park	Loss	0–5	
1906	24 November	Muirhead RFC	Thirdpart	Draw	0–0	
1906	8 December	Clydesdale 4XV	Titwood			
1906	22 December	Stirling HSFP 2XV	Thirdpart			
1906	29 December	A. Brown's XV	Thirdpart			
1907	12 January	Bellahouston Academicals	Norwood			
1907	2 February	Bearsden 2XV	Thirdpart			
1907	9 February	Cambuslang 2XV	Greenlees Farm			
1907-08 season
1907	21 September	Rowans Engineers RFC	Thirdpart	Draw	6–6	Tries: Rankin x 2
1907	28 September	Hillhead HSFP 2XV	Thirdpart	Win	9–0	Tries: Vermont, Charles Stuart
1907	5 October	Stirling HSFP	Thirdpart	Win	13–6	Tries: Inglis, Dunn
1907	12 October	Ayr 2XV	Dam Park			
1907	19 October	Bearsden 2XV	Douglaston			
1907	26 October	Bellahouston Academicals	Thirdpart	Loss	3–26	Try: Stewart
1907	2 November	Ayr 2XV	Thirdpart			
1907	9 November	Cartha	Thirdpart			
1907	16 November	Bishopbriggs 2XV	Bishopbriggs			
1907	14 December	Clydesdale 3XV	Thirdpart			
1907	28 December	Falkirk 2XV	Thornhill			
1908	4 January	Cambuslang 2XV	Greenlees Farm			
1908	11 January	Bellahouston Academicals	Norwood			
1908	18 January	Kilmarnock 2XV	Thirdpart			
1908	15 February	Cartha	Pollok Park	Loss	6–7	
1908	7 March	Clydesdale 3XV	Titwood			
1908-09 season
1908	26 September	Rowans Engineers RFC	Thirdpart	Win	9–3	Tries: Inglis x 2, Reid
1908	3 October	Bellahouston Academicals	Norwood	Loss	3–6	Try: Cruickshank
1908	10 October	Stirling HSFP	Williamfield	Loss	14–16	Tries: Inglis, McLeod, Thornton, Stewart
1908	28 November	Falkirk RFC	Thornhill	Loss	0–23	
1909	9 January	Lenzie RFC	Thirdpart	Loss	0–14	
1909	23 January	Bearsden 2XV	Douglaston	Win	17–3	Tries: Cuthbertson, Inglis, Garroway, other
1909	30 January	Old Larchfieldians	Helensburgh	Loss	8–9	
1909	20 February	Falkirk RFC	Thirdpart	Loss	3–11	
1909	13 March	Bellahouston Academicals	Thirdpart	Loss	0–3	
1909	20 March	Kilmarnock RFC	Thirdpart	Draw	0–0	
1909	3 April	Cambuslang RFC	Greenlees Farm	Win	11–6	
1909-10 season
1909	18 September	Rowans Engineers RFC	Thirdpart	Win	21–0	Tries: Inglis, Baird
1909	25 September	Western Rovers RFC	Westerlea	Win	6–0	Tries: Stewart, Kennedy
1909	2 October	Bellahouston Academicals	Thirdpart	Loss	3–13	
1909	16 October	Lenzie RFC	Thirdpart	Win	8–0	Tries: Cuthbertson, Harper
1909	23 October	Kilmarnock RFC	Kilmarnock	Win	6–0	Tries: Cram, Cuthbertson
1909	30 October	Craigielea	Gallowhill			
1909	6 November	Muirhead RFC	Muirhead	Draw	0–0	
1909	13 November	West of Scotland 2XV	Thirdpart	Loss	0–30	
1909	20 November	Bishopbriggs RFC	Thirdpart	Off	-	
1909	27 November	Falkirk RFC	Thirdpart	Win	8–0	Tries: Cuthbertson x 2
1909	11 December	Uddingston RFC	Thirdpart	Draw	3–3	Tries: Stewart
1909	18 December	Rowans Engineers RFC	Thirdpart	Win	30–0	Tries: Stewart x 4, Cuthbertson x 2, Inglis, Allan
1910	8 January	Lenzie RFC	Lenzie	Win	15–0	
1910	15 January	Falkirk RFC	Thornhill	Win	11–0	
1910	22 January	West of Scotland 2XV	Thirdpart	Off	-	
1910	29 January	Old Larchfieldians	Thirdpart			
1910	5 February	Glasgow University 'A'	Old Anniesland	Win	17–0	
1910	12 February	Uddingston RFC	Uddingston	Win	3–0	
1910	19 February	Stirling HSFP	Thirdpart	Win	3–0	Try: Fyfe
1910	26 February	Cambuslang RFC	Thirdpart	Win	14–0	Tries: Hiley, Aitken, Allan, C. Stewart
1910	12 March	Bishopbriggs RFC	Bishopbriggs	Win	3–0	Try: Hiley
1910	19 March	Kilmarnock RFC	Kilmarnock	Win	18–0	
1910-11 season
1910	24 September	Rowans Engineers RFC	Thirdpart	Win	3–0	
1910	1 October	Stirling HSFP	Williamfield	Win	15–8	
1910	15 October	Glasgow University 'A'	Anniesland	Win	20–0	
1910	29 October	Cambuslang RFC	Thirdpart	Win	16–0	Tries: J.A. Stewart x 2, Cruickshank, Fergus
1910	5 November	Muirhead RFC	Thirdpart	Win	17–3	
1910	19 November	Bishopbriggs RFC	Bishopbriggs	Off	-	
1910	10 December	Uddingston RFC	Meadowbank Park	Win	15–0	Tries: Fergus, 2 others
1910	17 December	Old Larchfieldians	Thirdpart	Loss	6–8	
1910	24 December	Cartha	Thirdpart	Win	3–0	
1911	28 January	Old Larchfieldians	Helensburgh	Draw	0–0	
1911	11 February	Glasgow University 'A'	Thirdpart	Win	13–0	Tries: Fullarton x 2, McLeod
1911	18 February	Bishopbriggs RFC	Thirdpart			
1911	4 March	Muirhead RFC	Muirhead	Draw	0–0	
1911	11 March	Uddingston RFC	Thirdpart	Win	10–3	
1911	18 March	Kilmarnock RFC	Thirdpart	Win	22–0	Tries: MacLeod x 3, Hiley, Inglis, Bryden
1911	25 March	Stirling HSFP	Thirdpart	Win	13–11	
1911-12 season
1911	25 September	Aberdeen GSFP	Mannofield	Win	14–8	Tries: W. Lindsay, C. H. Stuart, A. Reid, J. S. Stuart
1911	30 September	Stirling HSFP	Thirdpart	Loss	3–14	Try: Reid
1911	7 October	Bellahouston Academicals	Norwood	Win	16–0	Tries: Fergus, Cram, Roberts, Nelson
1911	21 October	Kilmarnock RFC	Thirdpart	Win	29–0	Tries: Fergus x 3, Cuthbertson, Roberts, Cruickshank
1911	28 October	Cartha	Pollok Park	Win	15–0	Tries: Fergus x 2, Drummond
1911	4 November	Muirhead RFC	Muirhead	Win	11–0	
1911	18 November	Glasgow HSFP 2XV	Thirdpart	Win	9–0	Tries: C.H. Stuart, Cruickshank, Drummond
1911	25 November	Kilmarnock RFC	Thirdpart			
1911	9 December	Clydesdale 2XV	Thirdpart	Win	28–0	Tries: Stewart, Riley, Buchanan, Fullarton x 2, Reid
1911	16 December	Old Larchfieldians	Helensburgh	Win	8–0	
1911	23 December	Bearsden RFC	Thirdpart	Loss	3-8	Try: McLeod
1912	13 January	Bearsden RFC	Dougalston	Loss	3–6	Try: Hiley
1912	20 January	Stirling HSFP	Williamfield	Win	10–3	Tries: McLeod, Rankin
1912	27 January	Old Larchfieldians	Thirdpart			
1912	17 February	Muirhead RFC	Thirdpart			
1912	9 March	Uddingston RFC	Thirdpart	Win	4–0	Game abandoned
1912	23 March	Ayr	Thirdpart	Loss	0-6	
1912	30 March	Clydesdale 2XV	Titwood	Loss	11-0	Tries: Cuthbertson, Cruickshank, Rankin
1912-13 season
1912	21 September	Rowans Engineers RFC	Thirdpart	Win	17–0	Tries: J. Stewart, Carmichael, Cuthbertson
1912	28 September	Stirling HSFP	Thirdpart	Win	12–0	Tries: Longmuir, Cuthbertson x 2, Rankin
1912	12 October	Hillhead HSFP	Scotstoun	Loss	0–16	
1912	19 October	Cambuslang RFC	Greenlees Farm	Win	11–3	
1912	26 October	Cartha	Dumbreck	Loss	6-9	Tries: Rankin
1912	9 November	Cartha	Thirdpart			
1912	23 November	Cambuslang RFC	Greenlees Farm	Loss	0–8	
1912	14 December	Old Larchfieldians	Thirdpart	Win	11–8	Tries: Longmuir, Drummond
1912	21 December	Bearsden RFC	Dougalston	Loss	0–9	
1913	11 January	Bearsden RFC	Dougalston			
1913	18 January	Stirling HSFP	Williamfield			
1913	25 January	Old Larchfieldians	Helensburgh			
1913	8 February	Ayr	Dam Park			
1913	15 February	Cambuslang RFC	Thirdpart	Win	27–0	Tries: Fullerton, Stewart x 2, Roberts, Rankine x 2, Reid
1913	1 March	Cartha	Pollok Park	Win	20–5	Tries: McKerrow, Roberts x 3
1913	8 March	Glasgow HSFP 2XV	Whiteinch	Win	14–0	Tries: Drummond, Fleming, Teasdale
1913	15 March	Cluny RFC	Craighouse Road	Draw	3–3	Try: Cuthbertson
1913-14 season
1913	11 October	Brunstane RFC	Joppa			
1913	18 October	Glasgow Academicals 2XV	Thirdpart			
1913	25 October	Cartha	Pollok Park	Loss	9–11	
1913	1 November	Greenock Wanderers 2XV	Battery Park	Win	3–0	
1913	8 November	Kelvinside Academicals 2XV	Balgray	Off	-	
1913	15 November	Greenock Wanderers	Battery Park	Loss	12–0	
1913	22 November	Hillhead HSFP	Scotstoun	Loss	4–14	
1913	29 November	Lismore RFC	Thirdpart			
1913	6 December	Ayr	Dam Park	Win	7–3	
1913	20 December	Bearsden RFC	Bearsden			
1914	17 January	Kilmarnock RFC	Kilmarnock			
1914	24 January	Cluny RFC	Cluny			
1914	31 January	West of Scotland 2XV	Thirdpart	Win	20–3	Tries: Lane, Gemmell, Tesdale, Cramb, Sutherland, Steven
1914	7 February	Ayr RFC	Ayr			
1914	14 February	Greenock Wanderers 2XV	Thirdpart			
1914	21 February	Hillhead HSFP	Scotstoun	Draw	3–3	Try: Reid
1914	28 February	Cartha	Thirdpart	Win	9–6	
1914	7 March	Lismore RFC	Thirdpart	Win	13–5	Try: Smith, Stewart
1914	14 March	Cluny RFC	Thirdpart	Loss	6–13	Tries: Roberts, Campbell
1914	28 March	Glasgow Academicals 2XV	New Anniesland	Loss	3–17	Try: Stevens

== Impact of the First World War ==
Considering a population of only 750, it seems remarkable that the club could attract around 50 men to fill three XVs sides to consistently play throughout the season. However, the enlistment of Drumchapel men to fight in the First World War in 1914 is all the more remarkable. Around 100 men of the village signed up; and it was said that Drumchapel had the biggest proportionate enlistment in Scotland.

The Scottish Referee of 18 September 1914 has an early list of rugby players signing up for service in the Great War: among them are listed the Drumchapel RFC players:- J.A. Stewart, W. Cramb and Charles Hugh Stewart. They were put in charge of a Red Cross detachment and had already left for France.

Fifteen Drumchapel men died in the Great War; their names marked at the St. Andrews Church cenotaph.

In rugby terms:- by the end of the War, Drumchapel had not enough men that were fit to play in a single XV team. The club folded.

It seems very likely that the Campbell that scored a try for Drumchapel against Cluny RFC on 14 March 2014 was one of four brothers James, John, Robert and Thomas Campbell - that all died in the First World War.

One of Drumchapel's star players Alexander Allan Cruickshank, who was selected for the Western League representative side, went to school at Dumbarton and then Hillhead High School. His name is thus mentioned in the 1921 Hillhead High School war memorial book:

A. ALLAN CRUICKSHANK

Lance Corporal, 17th Battalion Highland Light Infantry

Lance-Corporal Cruickshank (1888-1916) was the eldest son of the late Mr. A. A. Cruickshank [Alexander Allan Cruikshank (1859-1915)], Inland Revenue. He was educated at Dumbarton Academy and Hillhead High School. At School he took a keen interest in all games, and was much esteemed both by his fellows and his teachers. On leaving School he kept up his interest in games, and for several years he was a prominent figure in Drumchapel Rugby team, and later in Clydesdale. When war broke out he was in the employment of Messrs. Blackburn, King & Co., iron ore merchants, St. Vincent Street. He did not take long to decide where the path of duty lay, and was one of the first to join the newly formed Chamber of Commerce Battalion. He left for France in November, 1915, and came safely through till the beginning of the Great Push on the 1st of July, 1916. Since then he has been posted as missing, and the most diligent inquiries have failed to find any trace of him. The deepest sympathy is felt for his widowed mother [Isabella Cuthbertson Cruickshank], who had another son wounded in the same engagement.

His death is recorded as 1 July 1916 on the war records.

== Honours ==
- Western Junior League
  - Champions (1) : 1909-10

== Notable former players ==
=== Western Junior League players ===
The following former Drumchapel players represented the Western Junior League team to play other League and District teams.

- (Scotland) T. Inglis
- (Scotland) R. Cuthbertson
- (Scotland) C. W. Stewart
- (Scotland) A. A. Cruickshank

=== Glasgow District players ===
The following former Drumchapel players went on to represent Glasgow District.

- (Scotland) Charles Stuart

=== Scotland international players ===
The following former Drumchapel players went on to represent Scotland.

- (Scotland) Charles Stuart
