= William Black =

William Black may refer to:

== Politicians ==
- William Black (Ontario politician) (1867–1944), speaker of the Legislature of Ontario and Conservative MLA
- William Black (Canadian politician) (1869–1930), Progressive party member of the Canadian House of Commons
- William Anderson Black (1847–1934), Canadian politician
- William B. Black (Illinois politician) (1941–2023), member of the Illinois House of Representatives
- William George Black (1857–1932), antiquary, lawyer and politician of Glasgow
- William Pierpont Black (1877–1942), New Zealand wood carver, socialist politician, journal editor and publisher
- William Black, Lord Provost of Dundee, Scotland (1952–1954), see List of provosts of Dundee

== Soldiers and sailors ==
- William P. Black (1842–1916), American Civil War Medal of Honor recipient
- William Black (soldier) (1853–1872), drummer boy and the youngest wounded soldier of the American Civil War
- William Murray Black (1855–1933), United States Army major general
- William Black, captain of HMS Racoon, 1811–1815

== Business ==
- William Black (1771–1866), Canadian shipper, merchant, and office-holder
- William Black, Baron Black (1893–1984), British businessman and coachbuilder
- William Black (businessman) (c. 1902–1983), American businessman
- William Robert Black (1859–1930), Australia mine-owner and philanthropist
- Bill Black (businessman) (William Black, born 1950), Canadian businessman

== In religion ==
- William Grant Black (1920–2013), American episcopal bishop of Southern Ohio
- William Henry Black (1808–1872), English antiquarian and Seventh Day Baptist leader
- William Black (Methodist) (1760–1834), Methodist minister in Nova Scotia, Canada

== In arts and entertainment ==
- William Black (novelist) (1841–1898), Scottish novelist
- William Black (actor) (1871–?), Broadway stage and silent film actor
- William Black (pianist) (1952–2003), American classical pianist and teacher
- Bill Black (William Patton Black Jr., 1926–1965), American bassist and bandleader
- Willem de Zwart (1862–1931), Dutch painter, engraver and watercolorist also known as William Black

== Other ==
- William Black (physician) (1749–1829), Irish physician and medical writer
- William B. Black Jr. (born 1936), former Deputy Director of the U.S. National Security Agency
- William K. Black (born 1951), American lawyer, academic, author, and a former bank regulator
- William V. Black (1832–1927), Utah pioneer
- William Black (judge) (1879–1967), barrister and judge of the Supreme Court of Ireland
- William Black (footballer) (1882–1960), Scottish footballer
- Willie Black (footballer) (1929–2015), Scottish footballer
- William Black (pioneer) (c.1690-1762), British settler in America
- Bill Black (rugby union) (William Pollok Black, 1928–2019), Scottish rugby union player
- Bill Black (pilot) (William Arthur Black, 1943–2020), New Zealand pilot
- Bill Black (baseball coach) (William Ray Black, 1920–2002), American college baseball coach and construction company executive
- Buckskin Bill Black (William P. Black, 1929–2018), children's television host and later school board member in Baton Rouge, Louisiana
- Will Black (William Black, born 2006), Canadian college football offensive tackle
- William M. Black (dredge), named after William Murray Black

== See also ==
- Bill Black (disambiguation)
- USS General W. M. Black (AP-135), a transport ship named after William Murray Black
- William Black Family House, Arkansas, United States, on the National Register of Historic Places
- William Black Homestead, Pennsylvania, United States, on the National Register of Historic Places
- Willie Black (disambiguation), two people and a fictional character
- Willam Black, from Kevin Smith's "View Askewniverse" films
- Billie Black, British singer
