= Hillhead Jordanhill RFC =

(Scotland) Hillhead Jordanhill RFC
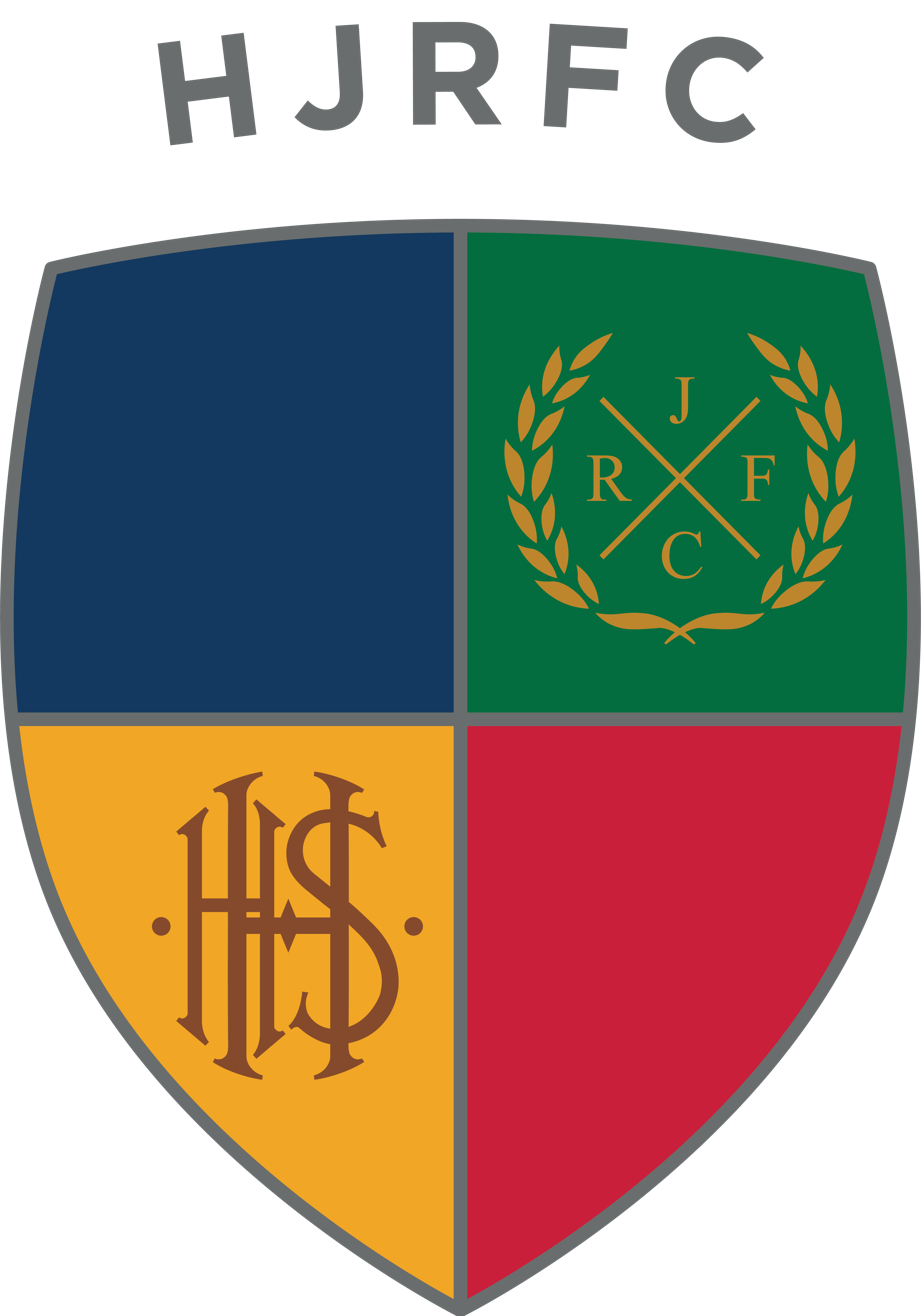
- Full name: Hillhead Jordanhill; Rugby Football Club
- Union: Scottish Rugby Union
- Founded: 1904 (Hillhead HSFP RFC); 1921 (Jordanhill RFC); 1988 (Merger); 1995 (Women)
- Location: Glasgow, Scotland
- Ground: Hughenden
- Coach(es): Men's: Stuart Irivine; Douglas Grove; Loïs Legendre; Women's: Aird Jardine; Tonci Buzov
- League(s): Men: Scottish National League Division Three; Women: Scottish Womens Premiership
- 2024–25: Men: Scottish National League Division Three, 3rd of 9 Women: Scottish Womens Premiership, 4th of 8

Official website
- www.hjrfc.com

Hillhead Jordanhill Rugby Football Club (HJRFC) is a Scottish rugby union club based in Glasgow, Scotland. HJRFC has roots going as far back as 1904 with the formation of the Hillhead Sports Club, however, the rugby club as we know it today was founded in 1988 with a Women's section added in 1995, they have played at their current home ground, Hughenden in the West End of Glasgow since then. Despite their name, the club is not located in either Hillhead or Jordanhill, although the pre-merger clubs did have historical links with these areas. Hughenden is located in Hyndland beside Great Western Road.

== Men's Rugby ==
- Men's 1st XV play in Scottish National League Division Three
- Men's 2nd XV play in West Reserve League Division 1
- Men's 3rd XV play in West Reserve League Division 3 (North)

== Women's Rugby ==
- Women's 1st XV

== 1st XV Captains & Co-Captains ==
Men's 1st XV Captain: (Scotland) Blair Colvin
Women's 1st XV Captain: (Scotland) Kate Yeomans

== History ==
The club was formed by the merger of Jordanhill Rugby Football Club (the rugby club of Jordanhill College) and Hillhead Rugby Football Club in 1988.

Jordanhill Rugby Football Club was founded as a club for the students and former students of Jordanhill College, Glasgow in 1921.

Hillhead Rugby Football Club has its roots in Hillhead Sports Club, founded in 1902 as a private club for former pupils of Hillhead High School, Glasgow, catering for various sports including football, cricket, hockey and athletics. A rugby team, Hillhead High School Former Pupils RFC (later Hillhead RFC), was formed in 1904. Initially the club used the Scotstoun Showgrounds before seeking to find a permanent home after the First World War, purchasing land at Hughenden in 1922. The club's new home, with its pavilion designed by W. Hunter McNab, was officially opened on 24 May 1924. Since then Hughenden has hosted a variety of sports including hockey, cricket and tennis, although it has been most closely associated with rugby. The first major sports tournament held at the club was the West of Scotland Tennis Championship in 1925. Due to the growing popularity of the rugby team, a grandstand was built alongside the pitch in 1934, designed by local consulting engineers FA MacDonald. The stand was built of reinforced concrete with a cantilevered roof, unusual for the time. It was first used in September 1934, for a match between Hillhead and Glasgow Academicals. In 1969, the clause restricting entry to the club to former students of Hillhead High School is removed to allow better recruitment and the club formerly becomes Hillhead RFC. The ground had an upgrade of their floodlights in 1977.

The culmination of season 2009–10 saw the club win the Scottish Premiership Division Three championship. The following season the club consolidated their position back in Scottish Premiership Division Two with a new coaching team made up of Grant Sweenie and Colin Dickson as joint head coaches. The 2nd XV under Gareth Morris and Stuart Torbet had a strong season ending with promotion to the top reserve league. Season 2011–12 saw a change to the coaching team with Grant Sweenie stepping down due to work commitments and another former Hills player, Derek Busby, taking over as head coach assisted by Colin Dickson. The 2nd XV also saw a change in coaching personnel with Gareth Morris stepping down due to work commitments with the new coaching team comprising club stalwarts Stuart Torbet and Murray Bell.

== Hughenden ==
Hughenden is a multi-sports venue in the Hyndland area of Glasgow, Scotland. It has been the home since 1924 of Hillhead Sports Club, a private members' club catering for cricket, rugby union and tennis. Hughenden is the home ground of Hillhead Jordanhill RFC. It was used as the home ground of the professional Glasgow Warriors rugby team from 1996 to 2007. Prior to the demolition of the grandstand, the main rugby ground had a capacity of 6,000.

== Hillhead Jordanhill Sevens ==
The club run the Hillhead Jordanhill Sevens tournament.

== Club Honours ==
=== Women ===
- 2009-10: Sarah Beaney Cup
- 2012–13: BT Women's Premier League & Sarah Beaney Cup
- 2013–14: BT Women's Premier League
- 2016–17: Sarah Beaney Cup
- 2017–18: BT Women's Premier League & Sarah Beaney Cup
- Mull Sevens
  - Champions: 2023

=== Men ===
- 2024-25 National League Cup Champions
- 2009–10: Scottish National League Division Three
- Glasgow City Sevens
  - Champions (1): 1999
- Bearsden Sevens
  - Champions: 1989, 1991
- Ross Sutherland Sevens
  - Champions: 1993
- Allan Glen's Sevens
  - Champions: 1989, 1990
- Kilmarnock Sevens
  - Champions: 2006

== Notable HJRFC Players & Coaches ==
=== Former coaches ===
- Aaron Collins
- Bill Dickinson, Scotland Rugby Union Coach, 1971–77
- Richie Dixon, Scotland Rugby Union Coach 1995–98, Glasgow Warriors Head Coach 1999-2002
- Hugh Campbell, Glasgow Warriors Head Coach 2003-06

=== Men's Internationalists ===
- William Alexander Ross
- Allan Cameron
- W.C.W. Murdoch
- Iain Ross
- I.A.A. MacGregor
- Dougie Hall
- Gordon Simpson
- Ron Glasgow
- Ian McLauchlan
- Gordon Strachan
- Tonci Buzov
- Nico Nyemba
- Jason Adamson
- Milan Marinkovic

=== Men's U20s Internationalists ===
- Blair MacKenzie
- Cameron McCulloch

=== Glasgow Warriors ===
- Dougie Hall (1999-2002 and 2007–2013)
- Alasdhair McFarlane
- Gordon Simpson

=== Edinburgh Rugby ===
- Dougie Hall (2007 - 2011)

=== Glasgow Men's District Players ===
- R.C. Graham
- I.E. Dawson
- I. Wilkie
- A.S. Nicolson
- J.D. Niven
- Allan Cameron
- K.C. Gordon
- I.A.A. MacGregor
- T.E.S. Ferguson
- J.A. Ferguson
- G.M. Guthrie
- David Jackson
- J.H. Roxburgh
- J. MacLauchlan
- I. MacLauchlan
- I. Cosgrove
- Richie Dixon
- C.S. Bisset
- P. Gallacher
- D.L. Turner
- W.J. Laurie
- J. Buchanan
- A.D. Armstrong
- Hugh Campbell
- B.A. Rankin
- J. Henderson
- J. Douglas

=== Women's Internationalists ===
- Susie Brown
- Heather Lockhart
- Jemma Forsyth
- Louise McMillan
- Abi Evans
- Jade Konkel
- Megan Gaffney
- Lindsey Smith
- Lana Skeldon
- Siobhan McMillan
- Hannah Smith
- Sarah Smith
- Mairi McDonald

=== Women's 7s Internationalists ===
- Louise McMillan
- Hannah Smith
- Abi Evans
- Megan Gaffney
- Jade Konkel
- Mairi McDonald
- Kirsty McConnell (extended squad uncapped)

=== Women's U20s Internationalists ===
- Siobhan McMillan
- Abi Evans
- Louise McMillan
- Mairi McDonald
- Kirsty Reid
