= Bill Black (disambiguation) =

Bill Black (1926–1965) was an American bassist and bandleader.

Bill Black may also refer to:

- William K. Black (born 1951), American lawyer, academic, author and a former bank regulator
- Bill Black (second baseman) (1899–1968), American baseball player
- Bill Black (baseball coach) (1920–2002), American college baseball coach and construction company executive
- Bill Black (businessman) (born 1950), Canadian insurance industry executive and politician
- Bill Black (comics), American publisher and editor of AC Comics, and freelance penciller and inker
- Bill Black (pilot) (1943–2020), New Zealand pilot
- Bill Black (rugby union) (1928–2019), Scottish rugby union player
- Bill Black (voice director) (born 1960), American musician, voice director and sound effects designer born William Thomas Blackwell III
- Buckskin Bill Black (1929–2018), long-running children's television host and later school board member in Baton Rouge, Louisiana
- Bill Black, one of the pseudonyms of Finnish singer Irwin Goodman (1943–1991)

== See also ==
- William Black (disambiguation)
- Billy Black (character), a character in Stephenie Meyer's Twilight series
