= Charles Stuart (rugby union, born 1887) =

Scotland international rugby union player

- Born: Charles Douglas Stuart; 18 May 1887 Glasgow, Scotland
- Died: 15 January 1982 (aged 94) Glasgow, Scotland

Rugby union career
- Position: Forward
Amateur team(s)
Years	Team	Apps	(Points)
- Drumchapel RFC
–	Uddingston RFC		
–	Clydesdale		
–	London Scottish		
–	West of Scotland		
–	Rowans Engineers RFC		
Provincial / State sides
Years	Team	Apps	(Points)
- Glasgow District
1911	Blues Trial		
International career
Years	Team	Apps	(Points)
1909-11	Scotland	7	(3)

Charles Douglas Stuart (18 May 1887 – 15 January 1982) was a Scotland international rugby union player. He often added Junior to his name; to differentiate from his father who had a similar career path. His regular playing position was Forward.

== Rugby Union career ==
=== Amateur career ===
Stuart began his rugby union career at Drumchapel RFC. He was a sporting all rounder excelling in not only rugby union but also football and cricket. As a young man in the Drumchapel side he was picked out - along with T. Inglis, C. L. Vermont and C. H. Stewart. - as starring in a match at Thirdpart against Hillhead HSFP 2XV.

The football club Glasgow Rangers were interested in signing the young man. This did not please his rugby loving father who instead sorted a move to Uddingston RFC for the player.

Stuart was later to move to Clydesdale and then London Scottish.

Stuart also played for West of Scotland.

=== Provincial career ===
Stuart played for Glasgow District in the inter-city match against Edinburgh District.

Stuart played for the Blues Trial side against the Whites Trial side on 21 January 1911 while still with West of Scotland.

=== International career ===
Stuart was capped seven times for Scotland between 1909 and 1911.

== Cricket career ==
Stuart played cricket for Poloc. He was Poloc's first century maker and played cricket well into the 1920s.

== Engineering career ==
Stuart got a job as an Engineer with Rowans Engineering working in the oil industry. This was to curtail his international career. At the age of 23 he moved to Burma with Rowans.

While at Rowans he organised a rugby side, Rowans Engineers RFC; run as an invitational side. The basis of the side were players from Uddingston, Clydesdale and West of Scotland.

Stuart never forgot his first club Drumchapel - and for many years he took his invitational side back there; and the Drumchapel - Rowan Engineers match became the traditional preseason opening fixture for the Thirdpart side.

== Journalism career ==
Later in life Stuart followed in the footsteps of his father and became a sports journalist writing for the Glasgow Herald; concentrating on rugby union and cricket matches.

== Family ==
Stuart's father Charles Douglas Stuart Senior played for Royal HSFP; a forward of the famous Nat Watt's Lambs side. Senior was also a journalist for the Glasgow Herald. Like his son Charles junior he enjoyed rugby and cricket. He died in 1933 at the age of 73.

Stuart's younger brother Ludovic Stuart was also capped for Scotland in the 1920s.

Stuart Junior's 90th birthday lunch was attended by 8 of Scotland's union Presidents - 4 from the Scottish Rugby Union and 4 from the Scottish Cricket Union.
