= Ludovic Stuart =

Scotland international rugby union player

- Born: Ludovic Mair Stuart; 22 October 1902 Scotland
- Died: 3 March 1957 (aged 54) Glasgow, Scotland
- University: University of Edinburgh
- Notable relative: Charles Stuart (brother)

Rugby union career
Amateur team(s)
Years	Team	Apps	(Points)
- Glasgow HSFP
Provincial / State sides
Years	Team	Apps	(Points)
1921	Glasgow District		
1922	Scotland Probables		
International career
Years	Team	Apps	(Points)
1923–30	Scotland	8	(3)
1923	Scotland & Ireland		
–	Barbarians	6	

Ludovic Stuart (22 October 1902 - 3 March 1957) was a Scotland international rugby union player.

== Rugby Union career ==
=== Amateur career ===
Stuart joined Glasgow HSFP in 1920. Due to his footballing prowess, he became known as a great exponent of dribbling with the oval rugby ball, which at the time was legal, fashionable, and an exponent in which the Scottish sides excelled.

He captained the side for a time.

=== Provincial career ===
He played for Glasgow District in the 1921 inter-city match.

He played for Scotland Probables in the first trial match of the 1922-23 season.

=== International career ===
He was capped eight times for Scotland between 1923 and 1930. The cry of 'Feet, Scotland, Feet!' became commonplace at Murrayfield Stadium due to the Scots dribbling skills with the rugby ball in this period, exemplified by Stuart.

He represented Scotland and Ireland in their centenary match against England and Wales in 1923.

He also played for the Barbarians.

== Football career ==
Like his brother Charles who was approached by Rangers, Ludovic was an accomplished footballer. He played for his school team Bellahouston Academy and was on trial at Queen's Park. However he quit football to concentrate on rugby union.

== Law career ==
He quit rugby union for some years to set up a law career, resulting in only 8 caps for Scotland. In addition, as team-mate Bill Johnston recalled, Stuart was also very outspoken and had a turbulent relationship with the Scottish Rugby Union which did not further his selection.

== Stolen car ==
Stuart hit the headlines in 1933 when his car was stolen from his home in 72 Hillhead Street in Glasgow by two youths. His car, a Morris Oxford, was notable for having a white steering wheel. Unfortunately as the youths made off with the car they injured two policemen attempting to stop the car, thus making the case much more notable. The youths were in fact charged with attempted murder, as the policemen jumped on the car's footrest; and the youths attempting to wrest them from the car rammed into the side of a passing tram. Stuart was a witness in the court.

== Family ==
His father was Charles Douglas Stuart senior, a former Royal HSFP player and rugby union journalist.

Ludovic was the brother of Charles Stuart who was also capped for Scotland in the pre-World War I period.

== Death ==
Stuart died in 1957, after being in poor health. He was survived by his wife, a son and 2 daughters.
