= Arthur Browning =

Scotland international rugby union player

- Born: Arthur Browning; 2 July 1897 Eaglesham, Scotland
- Died: 10 December 1962 (aged 65) Edinburgh, Scotland

Rugby union career
- Position: Wing
Amateur team(s)
Years	Team	Apps	(Points)
-	Glasgow HSFP		
Provincial / State sides
Years	Team	Apps	(Points)
1920-21	Glasgow District		
International career
Years	Team	Apps	(Points)
1920-23	Scotland	7	(22)

Arthur Browning (2 July 1897 – 10 December 1962) was a Scotland international rugby union player.

== Rugby Union career ==
=== Amateur career ===
Browning went to school at High School of Glasgow and was later a captain of the school.

Browning played for Glasgow HSFP and captained the side.

He was in the 1923-24 side that shared the Scottish Unofficial Championship with Glasgow Academicals.

The Chocolate and Gold history of Glasgow HSFP notes:

Browning also had the strongest drop kick of anyone in Scotland and his goal kicking was well above average. When Glasgow HSFP scored over 600 points in sharing the Scottish Unofficial Championship in 1923-24, Browning's share was nearly 180, despite missing nine games out of the 24 through injury.

=== Provincial career ===
He played for Glasgow District against Edinburgh District in the 4 December 1920 and 3 December 1921 inter-city matches.

=== International career ===
He played for Scotland seven times in period 1920 to 1923.

The Chocolate and Gold history of Glasgow HSFP notes that Browning is regarded as HSFP's finest wing/three-quarter player, and it was Browning who was seen as Scotland's most dangerous wing, even when paired with Eric Liddell on the other wing:

Arthur Browning played seven times for Scotland, scored a try in his first international against Ireland, scored another against France in his second; scored all nine points for Scotland against Wales in his third; and notched up nine more against Ireland the following season. Unfortunately his career was beset with injuries which forced his early retirement from the game or who knows what records he could have achieved... When he got the ball on the wing and set off for the opponent's line the atmosphere was electric, even when Eric Liddell was the other Scottish winger.

== Military career ==
During the First World War, Browning joined the Gordon Highlanders. He saw service in France and received a knee injury in the conflict.

He joined up again in the Second World War, this time with the 14th Light Anti-Aircraft Regiment. This was as a medical officer in the T.A. and he saw service in the Middle East. He was separated from the Regiment due an injury and had to apply to re-join them in Tobruk, but he ended up working in hospital ships from Port Said.

== Medical career ==
After the First World War ended, Browning joined the University of Glasgow. His knee injury did not seriously hamper him athletically and he was university champion for the four out of the five years of his course. He studied to be a doctor, and after graduation he worked in the Western Infirmary in Glasgow; and then the Pilkington Orthopaedic Hospital in St. Helens; he then became a G.P. in the North of England; then Sutton Coldfield; and then finally in Bathgate, where he worked for 29 years.

He retired as a G.P. in 1960. On his retirement the people of Bathgate organised a public testimonial, but Browning wished no ceremony and instead the testimonial was given to him privately.

== Family ==
His parents were William Browning (1861-1931) and Maggie McGregor Campbell (1870-1955). As well as Arthur, they had 2 daughters:- Margaret Campbell Browning (1899-1974) and Janet Browning (1904-1981).

Arthur married Jean Gowans Thomson (1895-1969) in Gorbals on 9 September 1927.

They had a daughter Nancy Browning.
