= Willie Black =

Willie Black is the name of:

- Willie Black (footballer) (1929–2015), Scottish footballer
- Willie Black, African-American golfer who constructed a golf course in Rogers Park, Tampa, member of the National Black Golf Hall of Fame
- Willie Black, a character in a series of novels by Howard Owen

== See also ==
- William Black (disambiguation)
