= Glasgow City Sevens =

Annual Scottish rugby sevens tournament

- Sport: Rugby sevens
- Instituted: 1935
- Number of teams: 16
- Country: Scotland
- Holders: (Scotland) Marr (2018)
- Most titles: (Scotland) Hawick Trades (25 titles)

Glasgow City Sevens is an annual rugby sevens tournament held by Cartha Queens Park, in Dumbreck in the south side of Glasgow. The tournament was previously known as the Cartha Sevens and the Cartha Queens Park Sevens.

== History ==
The first rugby sevens tournament started by Cartha RFC took place in April 1935 and continued for the following two years. After a break around the Second World War period the Sevens were reintroduced in 1950 and in has been played in all the subsequent years.

The tournament became known as the Cartha Queens Park Sevens on the merger of Cartha and Queens Park F.P. in 1974. The tournament has been called the Glasgow City Sevens since 2005.

== Legacy Sevens competition ==
Held around the start of every May, the tournament is part of the Legacy Sevens competition. The competition was developed to help the sport ahead of the Glasgow 2014 Commonwealth Games. It was launched in 2011.

The Legacy Sevens includes Sevens tournaments around Scotland's Central Belt.

Around 6 tournaments per year take part in each annual Legacy Sevens competition. The Legacy Sevens competition ends with the final Glasgow City Sevens showcase event. The Sevens tournaments involved are:-

- Stirling Sevens
- Boroughmuir Sevens
- Howe of Fife Sevens
- Hamilton Sevens
- Greenock Sevens
- Kirkcaldy Sevens
- Perthshire Sevens
- Glasgow City Sevens

=== Ranking points ===
The Legacy Sevens series is won by collecting ranking points. These points are gained by how well the teams progress in the Sevens tournaments represented.

Points are awarded as follows:

- Cup Winners – 15
- Cup Finalists – 10
- Cup Semi Finalists – 7
- Cup Quarter Finalists – 5
- Plate Winners – 5
- Plate Finalists – 2

Double points are awarded for the showcase Glasgow City Sevens tournament.

=== Sponsorship ===
The Legacy Sevens series is sponsored by Arnold Clark.

== Glasgow City Sevens Cup ==
The winners receive the Glasgow City Sevens Cup. There is also a Plate competition.

== Invited Sides ==
Various sides have been invited to play in the Glasgow City Sevens tournament throughout the years. Ospreys, Ulster and Wasps were invited in 2011. Tynedale and the Royal Scots were invited in 2016. London Scottish were invited in 2017. Saracens and Munster Rugby were invited in 2013. Newcastle Falcons and Dragons were invited in 2009. CUS Torino and Sale Sharks were invited in 2006 alongside Glasgow Warriors, Edinburgh and the Border Reivers. Ulster won the event in 2014.

=== International 7s sides ===
The Sweden 7s side took part in 2010.

== Sponsorship ==
NCS are longstanding sponsors of the tournament.

== Past winners ==
- 2018 (Scotland) Marr
- 2017 (England) Tynedale
- 2016 (Scotland) Scot. Rugby Academy
- 2015 (Scotland) Glasgow Hawks
- 2014 (Ireland) Ulster
- 2013 (Scotland) Glasgow Warriors
- 2012 (Scotland) Glasgow Ht. Aloysians
- 2011 (Scotland) Glasgow Warriors
- 2010 (Scotland) Glasgow Hawks
- 2009 (England) Sale Sharks
- 2008 (Wales) Dragons
- 2007 (England) Sale Sharks
- 2006 (Scotland) Edinburgh
- 2005 (Scotland) Edinburgh
- 2004 (Scotland) Glasgow Warriors
- 2003 (Scotland) Boroughmuir
- 2002 (Scotland) Glasgow Hawks
- 2001 (Scotland) Currie
- 2000 West of Scotland
- 1999 (Scotland) Hillhead Jordanhill
- 1998 (Scotland) East Kilbride
- 1997 (Scotland) Hutchesons Aloysians
- 1996 (Scotland) Cambuslang
- 1995 (Scotland) Grangemouth Stags
- 1994 (Scotland) Grangemouth Stags
- 1993 (Scotland) Hawick Trades
- 1992 (Scotland) Hawick Trades
- 1991 (Scotland) Hawick Trades
- 1990 (Scotland) Hawick Trades
- 1989 (Scotland) Hawick Trades
- 1988 (Scotland) Hawick Trades
- 1987 (Scotland) Hillhead
- 1986 (Scotland) Hawick Trades
- 1985 (Scotland) Hawick Trades
- 1984 (Scotland) Hillhead
- 1983 (Scotland) Cartha Queens Park
- 1982 (Scotland) Hawick Trades
- 1981 (Scotland) Cartha Queens Park
- 1980 (Scotland) Cartha Queens Park
- 1979 (Scotland) Hawick Trades
- 1978 (Scotland) Hawick Trades
- 1977 (Scotland) Hawick Trades
- 1976 (Scotland) Hawick Trades
- 1975 (Scotland) Hawick Trades
- 1974 (Scotland) Paisley Grammarians
- 1973 (Scotland) Kelvinside Academicals
- 1972 (Scotland) Kelvinside Academicals
- 1971 (Scotland) Grangemouth Stags
- 1970 (Scotland) Hawick Trades
- 1969 (Scotland) Hawick Trades
- 1968 (Scotland) Old Grammarians
- 1967 (Scotland) Hawick Trades
- 1966 (Scotland) Hawick Trades
- 1965 (Scotland) Hawick Trades
- 1964 (Scotland) Glasgow HSFP
- 1963 (Scotland) Hawick Trades
- 1962 (Scotland) Hawick Trades
- 1961 (Scotland) Hawick Trades
- 1960 (Scotland) Hawick Trades
- 1959 (Scotland) Bellahouston
- 1958 (Scotland) Haddington
- 1957 (Scotland) Haddington
- 1956 (Scotland) Haddington
- 1955 (Scotland) Haddington
- 1954 (Scotland) Jordanhill
- 1953 (Scotland) Jordanhill
- 1952 (Scotland) Jordanhill
- 1951 (Scotland) Hawick Trades
- 1950 (Scotland) Hawick Trades
- 1938–1949 Second World War
- 1937 (Scotland) Kelvinside Academicals
- 1936 (Scotland) Whitehill FP
- 1935 (Scotland) Glasgow HSFP

== See also ==
- Cartha Queens Park
- Scottish Rugby Union
