= Russell Donald =

- Born: Russell Lindsay Hunter Donald; 9 September 1898 Glasgow, Scotland
- Died: 31 December 1932 (aged 34) Clarkston, Scotland

Rugby union career
- Position: Fly-half
Amateur team(s)
Years	Team	Apps	(Points)
-	Glasgow HSFP		
Provincial / State sides
Years	Team	Apps	(Points)
-	Glasgow District		
-	Cities District		
-	Scotland Possibles		
International career
Years	Team	Apps	(Points)
1921	Scotland	3	(0)

Russell Donald (9 September 1898 – 31 December 1932) was a Scotland international rugby union player.

== Rugby Union career ==
=== Amateur career ===
Donald played for Glasgow HSFP.

He received a knee injury in 1919, but an operation in 1920 was successful, and he was selected by Scotland in 1921.

=== Provincial career ===
Donald played for Glasgow District.

He played for Cities District against Provinces District on 11 December 1920.

He played for Scotland Possibles against Scotland Probables on 8 January 1921.

=== International career ===
Donald received 3 caps for Scotland, all in 1921.

It seemed that he would go on and collect many more caps, but another knee injury stopped his playing career. Afterwards he went into coaching and became a selector for the national team.

== Business career ==
He worked in Canada for a while, with the firm Pilkington Brothers, the Glass manufacturers. While there he coached rugby, before returning to Scotland, still with the Pilkington Bros. company.

== Death ==
He died in 1932, a victim of an influenza outbreak. He is buried in Eastwood New Cemetery, outside of Glasgow.

His estate was valued at over £1830.
