= Bill Johnston (rugby union, born 1896) =

Scottish rugby union player (1896–1983)

- Born: William Carstairs Johnston; 16 December 1896 Woodlands, Manchester, Jamaica
- Died: 6 October 1983 (aged 86) Glasgow, Scotland

Rugby union career
- Position: Centre / Full Back
Amateur team(s)
Years	Team	Apps	(Points)
1914–	Glasgow HSFP		
Provincial / State sides
Years	Team	Apps	(Points)
1920-21	Glasgow District		
International career
Years	Team	Apps	(Points)
1922	Scotland	1	(0)

Bill Johnston (16 December 1896 – 6 October 1983) was a Scotland international rugby union player.

== Rugby Union career ==
=== Amateur career ===
Johnston went to the High School of Glasgow to 1914.

He played rugby union for Glasgow HSFP from 1914 onwards.

He captained the side from 1920 to 1922.

The alumni magazine of the school in describing Johnston in the 1921-22 season stated:

Johnston is possessed of the quiet charm which is the peculiar gift of all shy people. The High School has never produced a rugby player with a greater natural genius for the game. In every department he excels. His defence is impeccable, in kicking he combines length with accuracy, and no centre knows better than he just how and when to pass so as to give the wing the best possible chance.

=== Provincial career ===
He played for Glasgow District in the 1920 match, when he captained the side, and the 1921 inter-city match.

=== International career ===
He received one cap for Scotland, in 1922.

Although usually played at Centre, Johnston earned his Scotland cap at Full Back. It was said that his gave 'his usual sound performance', though Johnston later regretted that he was not 'playing in his proper place'.

== Military career ==
He joined the 6th Highland Light Infantry and saw service in Egypt and Sinai. He was then commissioned in the 9th H.L.I. and spent another two years at Ypres and the Somme. He was mentioned in despatches 3 times.

== Family ==
His father, Robert Johnston (1856-1934), was a missionary in Jamaica for over 55 years. He was responsible for the training of ministers, at the Tutorial College for Black Ministers. One of the ministers Robert Johnston trained was the father of the Olympic athlete Arthur Wint.
Bill Johnston's mother was Helen Alexander.
