= Aaron Collins =

Aaron Collins may refer to:

- Aaron Collins (footballer) (born 1997), Welsh footballer
- Aaron Collins (rugby union) (born 1971), New Zealand rugby union player
- Aaron Collins (singer) (1930–1997), American singer
