= Jimmy Tolmie =

Scotland international rugby union player

- Born: James Murdo Tolmie; 20 November 1895 New York City, United States
- Died: 9 March 1955 (aged 59)

Rugby union career
- Position: Wing
Amateur team(s)
Years	Team	Apps	(Points)
1913–	Glasgow HSFP		
Provincial / State sides
Years	Team	Apps	(Points)
1919	Glasgow District		
International career
Years	Team	Apps	(Points)
1922	Scotland	1	(0)

Jimmy Tolmie (20 November 1895 – 9 March 1955) was a Scotland international rugby union player.

== Rugby Union career ==
=== Amateur career ===
Tolmie went to the High School of Glasgow from 1907 to 1912.

He played rugby union for Glasgow HSFP from 1913 onwards.

He was noted as a resolute player, showing 'determination to go for the line at whatever cost to himself, his opponents, the corner flag, or the spectators'.

=== Provincial career ===
He played for Glasgow District in the 1919 inter-city match.

=== International career ===
He received one cap for Scotland, in 1922.

His solitary cap came after his clubmate, and rival for the Scotland place, Arthur Browning was injured in a match against Heriots.

== Military career ==
He enlisted soon after the First World War began. He was mentioned twice in despatches.

== Family ==
His father was Murdo Tolmie from Dingwall in Ross-shire, and his mother Elizabeth Masterton (c.1860–1945). He married Isobel Hunter Scott.

== Death ==
He died on 9 March 1955 and is buried in Biggar churchyard in South Lanarkshire.
