= John Collins (rugby union, born 1939) =

NZ international rugby union player (1939-2007)

- Born: John Law Collins; 1 February 1939 Tokomaru Bay, New Zealand
- Died: 29 May 2007 (aged 68) Gisborne, New Zealand
- Height: 1.78 m (5 ft 10 in)
- Weight: 79 kg (174 lb)
- School: Tokomaru Bay District High School
- Notable relative: Aaron Collins (son)

Rugby union career
- Position: Second five-eighth
Senior career
Years	Team	Apps	(Points)
1958–1968	Poverty Bay	49	
International career
Years	Team	Apps	(Points)
1964–1965	New Zealand	3	(0)

John Law Collins (1 February 1939 — 29 May 2007) was a New Zealand rugby union international.

Raised in Tokomaru Bay, Collins was a second five-eighth and played his rugby with Gisborne Marist. He made his provincial debut for Poverty Bay in 1958 and was later a New Zealand Maori representative.

Collins missed three years of rugby in the early 1960s due to army service in Malaysia and on his return soon came into All Blacks contention. He gained his first cap in the opening 1964 Bledisloe Cup match against the Wallabies at Carisbrook, before a back injury kept him out of the remainder of the series. The following year, Collins was capped a further two times in the home series against the Springboks, at Athletic Park and Eden Park.

Collins was married to Ingrid Collins. The couple had two children; their son, Aaron, was a Poverty Bay representative and played professional rugby in Scotland.

== See also ==
- List of New Zealand national rugby union players
