= Abi Evans =

Scotland international rugby union player

- Born: 30 May 1996 (age 30) Livingston, West Lothian
- Height: 1.69 m (5 ft 6 1/2 in)
- Weight: 76 kg (168 lb; 12 st 0 lb)
- School: Oban High School; Strathallan School
- University: Northumbria University
- Occupation: Rugby player

Rugby union career
- Position: Winger
- Current team: Saracens Women
Senior career
Years	Team	Apps	(Points)
- Hillhead Jordanhill
2019-2022	Darlington Mowden Park		
2022- present	Saracens Women		
International career
Years	Team	Apps	(Points)
2015–present	Scotland	15	(0)

Abi Evans (born 30 May 1996) is a Scottish rugby union player from Livingston who played in the 2021 Women's Six Nations Championship. She has played international rugby for Scotland since 2015.

== Club career ==
Abi Evans moved from Allianz Premier XVs club Darlington Mowden Park Sharks to Saracens Women in July 2022 ahead of the 2022–23 season.

She had joined DMP Sharks in 2019, moving from Hillhead Jordanhill.

While at Northumbria University, she also played for the university's team.

She played in the final of the Sarah Beaney Cup for Hillhead Jordanhill in 2018 and 2019.

== International career ==
Evans played in the Scotland U20 team, before making her Scotland international debut in the 2015 6 Nations opener against France. Evans earned further national caps in the 2017 Women's Six Nations Championship, coming on as a replacement in the match against England.

In 2019, Evans was one of the Scottish players selected for Scotland's rugby tour of South Africa. Evans scored a try in the last minutes of the match, contributing to the defeat of South Africa. Also in 2019, she was selected to play for Scotland in the World Rugby Women's Sevens Series in Biarritz. She described the 2019 World Series 7s Qualifiers in Hong Kong as a career highlight.

She then played in the 2020 Women's Six Nations Championship, which was disrupted due to COVID-19, playing in the postponed match against France in October following an injury, which saw her miss games earlier in the championship. This was despite being unable to join the team in training for the match due to COVID travel restrictions.

She was among the Scottish team selected for the 2021 Women's Six Nations Championship.

She was named by Head Coach Bryan Easson in the 35-player Scotland squad for the 2022 Women's Six Nations Championship.

At a junior national level, Evans played sevens at under-19 level for Scotland in the 2013 UK School Games and captained the side at the same tournament the following year.

== Personal life ==
Evans took up rugby while at Oban High School, aged 12. She continued her education at Strathallan School and played the sport at under-15, under-18 and under-20 levels.

Evans also swam for Scotland at national level for six years and represented Midland district in the 2012 British Inter-Counties.

She moved to Newcastle in 2019 to study Sport Management at Northumbria University.

She cites her rugby hero as Welsh player Shane Williams.

== Honours ==
- Brewin Dolphin under-18 Shield winner with Hillhead Jordanhill
