= Bob Gemmill =

Scotland international rugby union player

- Born: Robert Gemmill; 20 February 1930 Glasgow, Scotland
- Died: 25 December 2014 (aged 84) Glasgow, Scotland

Rugby union career
- Position: Lock
Amateur team(s)
Years	Team	Apps	(Points)
- Glasgow HSFP
–	Army Rugby Union		
–	Sale		
–	Middlesbrough		
–	Newcastle Northern		
–	Dublin Wanderers		
–	Glasgow HSFP		
Provincial / State sides
Years	Team	Apps	(Points)
- Glasgow District
-	Scotland Possibles		
-	Cheshire		
–	Yorkshire		
–	Northumberland		
–	Glasgow District		
International career
Years	Team	Apps	(Points)
1950-51	Scotland	7	(0)
1950-51	Barbarians		

Bob Gemmill (20 February 1930 – 25 December 2014) was a Scotland international rugby union player who played for Glasgow HSFP and Glasgow District at provincial level.

== Rugby Union career ==
=== Amateur career ===
He played for Glasgow HSFP and won the unofficial Scottish championship with them in the 1950-51 season.

He did his National Service for the Royal Signals and played rugby for the Army and Combined Services in England.

He moved on to play for Sale, Middlesbrough, Newcastle Northern and Dublin Wanderers; each time moving due to his business career with Procter & Gamble.

He finished his career with Glasgow HSFP and again won the unofficial Scottish championship with them in 1962.

=== Provincial career ===
Gemmill played for the Scotland Possibles side in 1947.

He was selected for Glasgow District. He played for Glasgow in the 1950-51 season, winning the Inter-City against Edinburgh District. He also won the Inter-City with Glasgow in the 1952-53 season.

He also played counties rugby for Cheshire, Yorkshire and Northumberland when in England.

Moving back to Glasgow, he was again selected for Glasgow District for the Scottish Inter-District Championship. He played in the 1960-61 season, however Glasgow came last in the table. He also played in the 1961-62 season's Inter-District Championship, but Glasgow fared no better.

=== International career ===
He was capped for Scotland seven times between 1950–51, making his debut against France at the age of nineteen. His last cap was against Ireland in 1951, a 6-5 defeat. The defeat against Ireland was to be the first loss in a series of 17 defeats during which Scotland used another 9 locks, but there was to be no international return for Gemmill.

Although exceptionally fit, his international caps were limited as he suffered in the debate that he was not big enough for second row at international level.

He was invited onto the Barbarians side in the 1950-51 season.

== Outside of rugby ==
=== Family ===
He married twice; his first wife, Anne, died from cancer in 1979, he married his second wife, Elisabeth, in 1980. He had three children, from his first marriage, John, Andrew and Alison and five grandchildren. His son, John, died of motor neuron disease in 2013.

=== Hobbies ===
Gemmill was a keen golfer, and liked travel and music. In his younger days he was a keen scout and attended the 1947 International Jamboree in France; a trip that he later recounted to the Scouts of St. Gilbert's Church for their own jamboree.

=== Church ===
He was treasurer of his local church, Sherbrooke St Gilbert’s Church in Pollokshields, for eight years. His period of treasurer was notable for his successful organising of a fund raising campaign to pay for church repairs after a disastrous fire.

=== University ===
He gained a first class honours degree in economics from Glasgow University. After graduation he served on the business committee of the general council of the University and also served on the University court. In recognition of his services to the university he was given an honorary doctorate in 2000.

=== Business ===
Gemmill worked for Procter & Gamble then PA Management Consultants. His move to PA Management Consultants meant that he could return home to Glasgow, and he resumed his rugby with Glasgow HSFP.
