= Glasgow HSFP =

Defunct Scottish rugby union club, based in Glasgow

(Scotland) Glasgow HSFP
- Full name: Glasgow High School Former Pupils Rugby Football Club
- Union: Scottish Rugby Union
- Founded: 1884
- Disbanded: 1982; 44 years ago
- Location: Glasgow, Scotland

Glasgow HSFP are a former rugby union team that played their home games at Glasgow, Scotland.

The team was founded in 1884 by former pupils of the High School of Glasgow. The team no longer exists.

In 1982 it merged with the Kelvinside Academicals - the rugby team of another school; the Kelvinside Academy - to form a rugby club called Glasgow High Kelvinside.

In 1997, Glasgow High Kelvinside merged with Glasgow Academicals to form Glasgow Hawks. Both GHK and Academicals survived the merger as spin-offs from the Hawks.

Originally, West of Scotland Football Club (known often as 'West') was also invited into the merger, but declined and continue to play at their club in Milngavie.

== History ==
Founded in 1884, Glasgow High School Former Pupils formed a rugby club. They played on a ground on the opposite side of Crow Road in Anniesland, Glasgow to the present pitches. Their first match was played against the 1st Lanark Volunteers.

The club played at various locations in the Anniesland area until the early years of the Twentieth Century.

The club became an open club in 1973. It dropped the F.P. from its name and became known as Glasgow High RFC.

== Glasgow HSFP Sevens ==
Glasgow HSFP ran a Sevens tournament in 1929.

== Notable former players ==
=== Scotland internationalists ===
The following former Glasgow HSFP players have represented Scotland at full international level.

- (Scotland) John Bannerman
- (Scotland) Bill Black
- (Scotland) Gordon Boyd
- (Scotland) Arthur Browning
- (Scotland) Angus Cameron
- (Scotland) Donald Cameron
- (Scotland) Jimmy Docherty
- (Scotland) Russell Donald
- (Scotland) John Dykes
- (Scotland) George Frew
- (Scotland) Percy Friebe
- (Scotland) Bob Gemmill
- (Scotland) Andrew Greig
- (Scotland) Michael Hunter
- (Scotland) William Ramsay Hutchison
- (Scotland) Jimmie Ireland
- (Scotland) Bill Johnston
- (Scotland) Hamish Kemp
- (Scotland) Lindsay Lambie
- (Scotland) Billy Munro
- (Scotland) Bobby Rowand
- (Scotland) Ian Shaw
- (Scotland) Robert Wilson Shaw
- (Scotland) Jack Stewart
- (Scotland) Ludovic Stuart
- (Scotland) John Sweet
- (Scotland) Jimmy Tolmie

=== Glasgow District ===
The following former Glasgow HSFP players have represented Glasgow District at provincial level.

- (Scotland) G.C. Langlands
- (Scotland) I. McLaren
- (Scotland) J.H. Riddell
- (Scotland) L.B. Lambie
- (Scotland) Andrew Greig
- (Scotland) Bill Black
- (Scotland) Bobby Rowand
- (Scotland) Ian Shaw
- (Scotland) Robert Wilson Shaw
- (Scotland) I. Mackay
- (Scotland) Russell Donald
- (Scotland) Bill Johnston
- (Scotland) John Dykes
- (Scotland) Hamish Kemp
- (Scotland) Bob Gemmill
- (Scotland) Jimmy Docherty
- (Scotland) Michael Hunter

== Honours ==
- Scottish Unofficial Championship
  - Champions (5): 1923-24 (shared with Glasgow Academicals), 1935-36, 1950-51, 1953-54, 1961-62
- Glasgow City Sevens
  - Champions (2): 1935, 1964
- Gala Sevens
  - Champions (1): 1950
- Ayr Sevens
  - Champions: 1967, 1968, 1970, 1976
- Kilmarnock Sevens
  - Champions: 1937, 1973
- Allan Glen's Sevens
  - Champions: 1976
- Glasgow Academicals Sevens
  - Champions: 1974
- Bearsden Sevens
  - Champions: 1971
- Clarkston Sevens
  - Champions: 1970, 1973, 1982
- Glasgow University Sevens
  - Champions: 1898, 1949, 1956, 1967, 1973
- Hillhead HSFP Sevens
  - Champions: 1972, 1973
- Edinburgh Borderers Sevens
  - Champions: 1926
- Helensburgh Sevens
  - Champions: 1973
- Kelvinside Academicals Sevens
  - Champions: 1922
- Hutchesons' GSFP Sevens
  - Champions: 1926
