= Andrew Greig (rugby union) =

Scotland international rugby union player

- Born: Andrew Greig; 27 October 1889 Glasgow, Scotland
- Died: 7 January 1959 (aged 69) Havertown, Delaware County, Pennsylvania, United States

Rugby union career
- Position: Full Back
Amateur team(s)
Years	Team	Apps	(Points)
- Glasgow HSFP
Provincial / State sides
Years	Team	Apps	(Points)
1910	Glasgow District		
International career
Years	Team	Apps	(Points)
1911	Scotland	1	(0)

Andrew Greig (27 October 1889 – 7 January 1959) was a Scotland international rugby union player. He played at the full-back position.

== Rugby Union career ==
=== Amateur career ===
Greig played for Glasgow HSFP.

=== Provincial career ===
The Scottish Referee gave this brief biography of Greig on the 28 November 1910, just before the Inter-City match, and predicted international honours:

In his school days, Andrew Greig, was looked upon as one whose reputation as a Rugby footballer would be made as a half-back, but when he reached the formers he was induced to accept his place in the last line of defence. His success as a full back is undoubted, and the choice of the Glasgow Committee in selecting him again for that position against Edinburgh will be received with satisfaction. An excellent defender and grand kick, Greig's share of honours may not be confined to Inter-City games.

Greig played in the Inter-City match on 3 December 1910 for Glasgow District against Edinburgh District.

=== International career ===
After a disappointing showing in the Blues Trial versus Whites Trial match on 21 January 1911 by the backs, it was hoped that Greig - who didn't play in the Trial match - would recover from his injury to take the full back place against Wales. The Dundee Evening Telegraph expressing this hope:

The defence in Saturday's trial match was the poorest ever seen in a game of this importance. The three-quarters and backs both sides were rank bad, and it therefore occasioned no great surprise when it was found that the Union selectors had passed over both backs, and had elected Andrew Greig to play in that position against Wales. It is hoped he will have recovered sufficiently to enable him to take his place, for, from what we saw on Saturday, he will be badly wanted.

Unfortunately for Greig, the match came too soon. However he later received a cap later in the Five Nations of that season.

Greig was capped by Scotland for just one match. This was the Five Nations match against Ireland on 25 February 1911. Ireland won the match 16 - 10.
