= Ingrid Collins =

New Zealand businesswoman (born 1945)

Dame Ingrid Collins DNZM
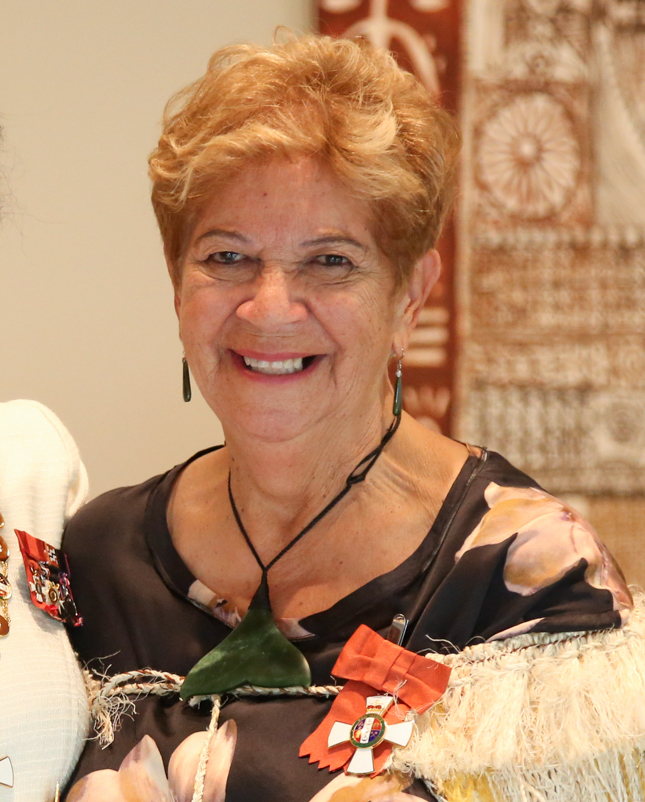
- Collins in 2025
- Born: Nea Ingrid King; 1945 (age 80–81)
- Spouse: John Collins (m. 1966; died 2007)
- Children: 2
- Relatives: Aaron Collins (son)

Dame Nea Ingrid Collins DNZM (née King; born 1945) is a New Zealand businesswoman based in Gisborne. She chaired the Tairawhiti District Health Board from 2001 until 2010.

== Career ==
Since 1974, Collins has worked within the Māori land business, such as managing land incorporations. Since the 1970s, she has been trustee and chairwoman of Whangara B5 and Whangara Farms.

Collins was appointed to the Tairawhiti District Health Board in 2001, and chaired until 2010. She was appointed to the Crown Health Financing Agency in December 2010, where served from 2011 until 2012. In early 2013 Collins was appointed to the National Animal Welfare Advisory Committee. As of 2013 she is a member of the AgResearch Māori Advisory Committee, co-owns and chief executive of Three Rivers Medical in Gisborne, and is a trustee of Chelsea Private Hospital also in Gisborne.

In the 2008 New Year Honours, Collins was appointed a Member of the New Zealand Order of Merit (MNZM), for services to Māori. In the 2025 New Year Honours (New Zealand), she was promoted to Dame Companion of the New Zealand Order of Merit, for services to Māori, business, and health governance.

== Personal life ==
Collins has iwi affiliations to Te Aitanga-a-Hauiti, Ngāti Oneone and Ngāti Kahu. In 1965, she became engaged to rugby union player John Collins, and they married at St Mary's Catholic Church in Gisborne the following year. The couple had two children, including Aaron Collins, also a rugby player. John Collins died in 2007.
