= Laurie Duff =

British Lions & Scotland international rugby union player

- Born: Peter Laurence Duff; 12 November 1912 Bothwell, Scotland
- Died: 6 November 2002 (aged 89) Stirling, Scotland

Rugby union career
- Position: No. 8
Amateur team(s)
Years	Team	Apps	(Points)
-	Glasgow Academicals		
–	Uddingston		
Provincial / State sides
Years	Team	Apps	(Points)
- Glasgow District
-	Scotland Possibles		
International career
Years	Team	Apps	(Points)
1936-39	Scotland	6	(6)
1938	British and Irish Lions	2	(6)

Peter Laurence Duff (12 November 1912 – 6 November 2002) was a Scotland international rugby union player. He also represented the British and Irish Lions.

== Rugby Union career ==
=== Amateur career ===
He played for Glasgow Academicals, and Uddingston.

=== Provincial career ===
He represented Glasgow District.

He played for the Scotland Possibles side in their trial match against the Scotland Probables on 15 January 1938.

=== International career ===
He played 6 matches for Scotland.

He was selected for the 1938 British Lions tour to South Africa playing in two of the Test matches against South Africa, scoring a try in both.
