= Jimmy Docherty =

Scotland international rugby union player

- Born: James Thomas Docherty; 5 June 1931 Glasgow, Scotland
- Died: 18 October 2014 (aged 83) St Andrews, Scotland

Rugby union career
- Position: Centre
Amateur team(s)
Years	Team	Apps	(Points)
- Glasgow HSFP
Provincial / State sides
Years	Team	Apps	(Points)
- Glasgow District
International career
Years	Team	Apps	(Points)
1955-58	Scotland	8	(3)

Jimmy Docherty (5 June 1931 – 18 October 2014) was a Scotland international rugby union footballer. In his rugby career he played as a Centre.

== Rugby union career ==
=== Amateur career ===
Docherty played for Glasgow HSFP.

=== Provincial career ===
He was selected by Glasgow District to play Australia.

=== International career ===
He was capped for Scotland 8 times between 1955 and 1958.

Docherty also played for the Barbarians.

== Outside of rugby ==
=== Family ===
His father was a tailor but he was also a noted footballer; on the books for Glasgow Rangers, Clyde and Ayr United.

=== Business ===
After he retired from rugby he ran the family tailor business.
