= Billy Munro (rugby union) =

Scotland international rugby union player

- Born: William Hutton Munro; 28 September 1918
- Died: 12 September 1970 (aged 51)

Rugby union career
- Position: Centre
Amateur team(s)
Years	Team	Apps	(Points)
- Glasgow HSFP
Provincial / State sides
Years	Team	Apps	(Points)
- Glasgow District
International career
Years	Team	Apps	(Points)
1947	Scotland	2	(0)

Billy Munro (28 September 1918 - 12 September 1970) was a Scotland international rugby union player who played at centre.

== Rugby Union career ==
=== Amateur career ===
Munro played for Glasgow HSFP.

=== Provincial career ===
Munro played for Glasgow District.

=== International career ===
He was capped a total of two times for the Scotland international team. Both caps were in 1947.
