= Cartha Queens Park RFC =

Scottish rugby union club, based in Glasgow

Cartha Queens Park
- Full name: Cartha Queens Park Rugby Football Club
- Union: Scottish Rugby Union
- Founded: 1974; 52 years ago
- Location: Glasgow, Scotland
- Ground: Dumbreck (Capacity 2,000)
- President: Andrew Wilson
- Coach(es): Peter Lavery, Wayne Evans, Kenny Brown, Jack Reid, Dan Tams
- Captain: Stewart Hamilton
- League(s): Men: Scottish National League Division Four; Women: Scottish Women's Premiership
- 2024–25: Men: Scottish National League Division Three, 9th of 9 (relegated); Women: Scottish Women's Premiership, 6th of 8
Team kit

Official website
- www.carthaqp.co.uk

The Cartha Queens Park Rugby Football Club is a rugby union side based in Glasgow, Scotland. It was founded in 1974, after the merger of Cartha RFC and Queens Park F.P. They play their home games at Dumbreck. The women's 1st XV are currently in the Scottish Women's Premiership, the men's 1st XV are currently in Scottish National League Division Three.

== History ==
Cartha Athletic Club was founded in 1889. The 'athletic' club played a number of sports: Cricket, Athletics, Rugby, Tennis, Hockey... the association was hence named Cartha. The rugby union section was established in 1906. In 1974 Cartha RFC and Queens Park F.P. merged to form the present day rugby union club.

The club runs four adult XVs for men and women catering for all abilities and levels of experience. At Dumbreck there is an impressive youth section catering for over 200 local children aged 5 to 17. The club also has a senior women's side currently competing in the Scottish Women's Premier League at Premier 1 level.

== Notable former players ==
- Christine Belisle - Scotland and Loughborough Lightning
- Ruaridh Jackson - Scotland and Glasgow Warriors

== Glasgow City Sevens ==
Cartha Queen's Park previously played host to the Glasgow City Sevens tournament at Dumbreck. This was originally known as the Cartha Sevens. The first rugby sevens tournament took place in April 1935 and continued for the following two years. After a break, for the Second World War period, the Cartha Sevens were reintroduced in 1950 and has then been played in all the subsequent years. On the merger of Cartha RFC and Queens Park F.P. in 1974 the tournament became known as the Cartha Queens Park Sevens. The Cartha Queens Park tournament was renamed to the Glasgow City Sevens Tournament in 2005.

== Honours ==
=== Men ===
- BT National League 2
  - Champions: 2016–17
- Glasgow City Sevens
  - Champions (3): 1980, 1981, 1983
- Glasgow University Sevens
  - Champions: 1984, 1985
- Helensburgh Sevens
  - Champions: 1983, 1984
- Lenzie Sevens
  - Champions: 1985, 1988
- Old Aloysians Sevens
  - Champions: 1976
- Moray Sevens
  - Champions: 1994

=== Women ===
- Mull Sevens
  - Champions: 2009, 2010, 2011
