= Gordon Boyd (rugby union) =

Scotland international rugby union player

- Born: Gordon Mclean Boyd; 8 March 1905 Cadder, Glasgow, Scotland
- Died: 21 February 1980 (aged 74) Pulborough, England

Rugby union career
- Position: Wing
Amateur team(s)
Years	Team	Apps	(Points)
1922-27	Glasgow HSFP		
Provincial / State sides
Years	Team	Apps	(Points)
1924	Whites Trial		
International career
Years	Team	Apps	(Points)
1926	Scotland	1	(0)

Gordon Boyd (8 March 1905 - 21 February 1980) was a Scotland international rugby union player.

== Rugby Union career ==
=== Amateur career ===
He played for Glasgow HSFP.

He was part of the Glasgow HSFP side that shared the 1923-24 Scottish Unofficial Championship season title with Glasgow Academicals. Boyd scored 28 tries that season, including 6 in one match and 4 in another.

The Chocolate and Gold history of Glasgow HSFP recalls:

He was a very elusive winger who, though not lightning fast, had a fine swerve and played at centre and stand-off when required.

=== Provincial career ===
He played for the Whites Trial side on 15 December 1924.

=== International career ===
He was capped by Scotland just the once, in 1926, to play against England at Twickenham.

== Family ==
His father was David Mitchell Boyd who died in 1955.

Gordon Boyd married Hannah Margaret Allison Murdoch (1907-1980) on 10 November 1934 in Yangon, Burma.
