= Hawick Trades =

(Scotland) Hawick Trades
- Full name: Hawick Trades Rugby Football Club
- Union: Scottish Rugby Union
- Founded: 1946
- Disbanded: 2004
- Location: Hawick, Scotland
- Ground: Volunteer Park

Hawick Trades is a former rugby union club based in Hawick, in the Scottish Borders. They played in the Border League until 2004.

== History ==
The club began in 1946. It was founded after the Second War by Hawick apprentices; based on a Combined Trades team that came together during the Second World War.

== Association with Glynneath ==
From 1956, Hawick Trades have had a close association with the Welsh club Glynneath RFC. Since that date the clubs have played each other, one year at home; the next away.

== Disbanding of the club ==
At the start of the 2004–05 season the Border League announced that Hawick Trades would be withdrawn from the league as their lack of players meant that their fixtures would be unfulfilled.

Since the club's demise, Hawick Trades now acts as a social club for former players.

== Notable former players ==
=== British and Irish Lions ===
- (Scotland) Colin Deans

=== Scotland internationalists ===
- (Scotland) Derrick Grant
- (Scotland) Derek Turnbull
- (Scotland) Cameron Murray
- (Scotland) Scott MacLeod
- (Scotland) Greig Oliver
- (Scotland) Colin Telfer
- (Scotland) Norman Pender
- (Scotland) Keith Murray

== Honours ==
- Cartha Sevens
  - Champions (25): 1950, 1951, 1960, 1961, 1962, 1963, 1965, 1966, 1967, 1969, 1970, 1975, 1976, 1977, 1978, 1979, 1982, 1985, 1986, 1988, 1989, 1990, 1991, 1992, 1993
- Walkerburn Sevens
  - Champions (3): 1950, 1969, 1985
- Gala Y.M. Sevens
  - Champions: 1970
- Langholm Junior Sevens
  - Champions: 1964, 1965, 1966, 1967, 1968, 1982, 1996
- Lasswade Sevens
  - Champions: 1950, 1951, 1952, 1953, 1954, 1955, 1957
- Haddington Sevens
  - Champions: 1949, 1952, 1954, 1968
- South of Scotland District Sevens
  - Champions: 1950, 1973, 1976, 1985, 1990
- Kilmarnock Sevens
  - Champions: 1958, 1959, 1964, 1968
