= Bobby Rowand =

Scotland international rugby union player

- Born: Robert Rowand; 30 August 1906 Paisley, Scotland
- Died: 23 February 1974 (aged 67) Glasgow, Scotland

Rugby union career
- Position: Flanker
Amateur team(s)
Years	Team	Apps	(Points)
- Glasgow HSFP
Provincial / State sides
Years	Team	Apps	(Points)
- Glasgow District
1933	Scotland Probables		
International career
Years	Team	Apps	(Points)
1930-34	Scotland	7	(0)

Bobby Rowand (30 August 1906 – 23 February 1974) was a Scotland international rugby union player. He played as a Flanker.

== Rugby Union career ==
=== Amateur career ===
Rowand came to the High School of Glasgow in 1921 from Paisley Grammar School. He did not play rugby until his final year at the high school in 1922–23. However, he was very athletic, breaking the school's 19 year old high jump record. He represented the school in both the high jump and long jump and was very good at tennis.

Rowand played for Glasgow HSFP, initially on the wing, before he found his favourite position at flanker.

=== Provincial career ===
He was capped by Glasgow District in 1929. He played for Glasgow against South Africa on 28 October 1931.

He played for the Scotland Probables side against the Scotland Possibles side on 14 January 1933 while still with Glasgow HSFP.

=== International career ===
Rowand was capped by Scotland 7 times from 1930 to 1934.

== Farming career ==
After his rugby union career finished, he went back to his family farm at Candrens near Paisley. His family had farmed there for over 300 years.

== Family ==
He was the son of John Rowand (1860-1936) and Mary Gardner (1866-1943). John Rowand was a farmer at Candrens and a director of the Renfrewshire Agricultural Society.

Bobby Rowand married Margaret Laird in Rosebank Church, Cambuslang, on 21 November 1934. Jimmie Ireland was his best man.

Bobby and Margaret had 2 sons, John and Rab, and a daughter, Liz.

== Death ==
He died at the Victoria Infirmary in Glasgow on 23 February 1974. The service was in Paisley Abbey, and his body was taken to Woodside Crematorium.
