= Grangemouth Stags =

Scottish rugby union club

- Union: Scottish Rugby Union
- Founded: 1929; 96 years ago
- Location: Grangemouth, Scotland
- Ground(s): Glensburgh Park
- League(s): Men: Caledonia Division One; Women: Scottish Womens Midlands & East One
- 2019–20: Men: Caledonia Division One, 5th of 10; Women: Scottish Womens Midlands & East One
Team kit

Grangemouth Stags is a rugby union club based in Grangemouth, Scotland. The men's side currently compete in Caledonia Division One, the women's side currently compete in Scottish Womens Midlands & East One. The club play their home matches at Glensburgh Park.

== History ==
There was a previous club in Grangemouth connected to the chemical firm I.C.I. This club was founded for season 1962–63. However I.C.I. Grangemouth RFC disbanded and transferred its assets to Falkirk RFC in 1972.

== Women's rugby ==
The club run a women's side called the Stagettes.

== Sevens ==
The club runs the Grangemouth Sevens tournament.

== Honours ==
=== Men's ===
- Scottish National League Division Three
  - Champions (1): 1992
- Caledonia League Division Two Midlands
  - Champions (1): 2016-17
- Glasgow City Sevens
  - Champions (3): 1971, 1994, 1995
- Cambuslang Sevens
  - Champions (1): 1992
- Lanarkshire Sevens
  - Champions (1): 1975
- Orkney Sevens
  - Champions (9): 1990, 1991, 1992, 1993, 1994, 1995, 1997, 2002, 2005
- Glasgow University Sevens
  - Champions (1): 1992
- Drumpellier Sevens
  - Champions (2): 1990, 1991
- Glenrothes Sevens
  - Champions (1): 1996
- Kirkcaldy Sevens
  - Champions (1): 1996
