= Lindsay Lambie =

- Full name: Lindsay Barbour Lambie
- Born: 30 May 1910 Eastwood, Lanarkshire, Scotland
- Died: September 1996 (aged 86) Toowoomba, Queensland, Australia

Rugby union career
- Position: Wing-forward / Hooker
International career
Years	Team	Apps	(Points)
1934–35	Scotland	7	(3)

Lindsay Barbour Lambie (30 May 1910 — September 1996) was a Scottish international rugby union player.

Lambie was born in Eastwood, Lanarkshire, and played his rugby with Glasgow HSFP.

A stocky forward, Lambie made his debut for Scotland in 1934 as a hooker, but for his remaining appearances was used as a wing-forward. He gained seven caps in his two years playing international rugby and scored a try to help Scotland win the 1935 Calcutta Cup. His last match was against the All Blacks at Murrayfield, before he retired at age 25.

Lambie emigrated to Australia in the early 1950s.

== See also ==
- List of Scotland national rugby union players
