= Queens Park F.P. =

Scottish rugby union club

(Scotland) Queens Park F.P.
- Full name: Queens Park Former Pupils Rugby Football Club
- Union: Scottish Rugby Union
- Founded: 1906
- Disbanded: 1974
- Location: Glasgow
- Ground: Nether Pollok

Queens Park F.P. was a twentieth-century Glasgow-based rugby union club. The club merged with Cartha RFC to form Cartha Queens Park RFC in 1974.

== History ==
The rugby club naturally grew from former pupils of Queen's Park Secondary School. The school itself was built in 1874 by the Cathcart Parish School Board. The Secondary School served the feeder Primary Schools of Cuthbertson, Victoria, Annette Street and Toryglen. The Secondary was closed in 1994 and instead became a Teachers Resource Centre. The site was later bought by Victoria Infirmary to be used in the hospital's expansion. The Secondary School was eventually demolished in the late 1990s.

=== Formation of the rugby club ===
By 1906 a rugby club had formed. It was admitted to the SRU in 1908.

=== Ground ===
The club played its matches at Nether Pollok.

== Merger ==
The two Glasgow southside clubs of Cartha RFC and Queens Park F.P. were struggling by the end of the 1973–74 season. Cartha was mid-table in the Division 5 West league; whilst Queens Park F.P. finished bottom of the same league with the fate of relegation hanging over them.

So for the following season 1974-75 the two clubs decided to merge to try and strengthen their position.

== Honours ==
- Lanarkshire Sevens
  - Champions (1) : 1964
