= Jack Stewart (rugby union) =

- Born: 19 February 1905
- Died: 27 May 1936 (aged 31)
- School: Glasgow High School

Rugby union career
- Position: Forward
International career
Years	Team	Apps	(Points)
1930	Scotland	1	(0)

Jack Stewart (19 February 1905 – 27 May 1936) was a Scottish international rugby union player.

Stewart was educated at Glasgow High School.

A strongly–built second row forward, Stewart was the first player tried as a replacement for John Bannerman, appearing in the opening fixture of the 1930 Five Nations in Paris.

== See also ==
- List of Scotland national rugby union players
