= Allan Cameron (rugby union) =

Scotland international rugby union player

- Born: Allan Douglas Cameron; 4 March 1924 Glasgow, Scotland
- Died: 15 October 2009 (aged 85) Glasgow, Scotland
- Height: 1.80 m (5 ft 11 in)
- Weight: 89 kg (14 st 0 lb)
- School: Hillhead High School

Rugby union career
- Position: Centre / Wing
Amateur team(s)
Years	Team	Apps	(Points)
–	Hillhead HSFP		
Provincial / State sides
Years	Team	Apps	(Points)
–	Glasgow District		
-	Scotland Possibles		
International career
Years	Team	Apps	(Points)
1951–54	Scotland	3	(0)

Allan Cameron (4 March 1924 – 15 October 2009) was a Scotland international rugby union footballer. Normally a Centre, he also played on the Wing.

== Rugby career ==
=== Amateur career ===
Cameron played for Hillhead HSFP.

=== Provincial career ===
He broke through while playing with Hillhead HSFP to play for Glasgow District.

He was part of the Glasgow District side that won the Inter-City match against Edinburgh in 1947–48. He later won three Inter-City matches in a row with Glasgow in 1950–51, 1951–52 and 1952–53.

He was selected for the Scotland Possibles side in 1947.

He played in the Scottish Inter-District Championship winning the title with Glasgow in the 1955–56 season. It was Glasgow's first Inter-District title.

=== International career ===
He was capped for Scotland three times from 1951 to 1954, playing in three Five Nations matches. He was capped initially at Wing for his debut but was later capped at Centre.

His 1951 debut was bittersweet. Scotland narrowly lost against France but Cameron proudly returned to his home with the match ball. He opened the front door and threw the ball inside then discovered from his crestfallen mother and sister that his father had died just hours before.

=== Selector ===
After his playing career finished, Cameron became a selector for the Glasgow District committee.

== Outside of rugby ==
Cameron was a company director with Robin Ramsay & Co, a hide and skin brokers.

He was a keen golfer and angler. He would often go fishing with Iain Ross, former Hillhead HSFP and Scotland scrum-half.
