= Cambuslang RFC =

Scottish rugby union club, based in Cambuslang, South Lanarkshire

Coordinates: 55.81477°N 4.187357°W

(Scotland) Cambuslang RFC
- Full name: Cambuslang Rugby Football Club
- Union: Scottish Rugby Union
- Founded: 1903; 122 years ago
- Location: Cambuslang, Scotland
- Ground(s): Coats Park
- League(s): West Division One
- 2019–20: West Division One, 10th of 10
Team kit

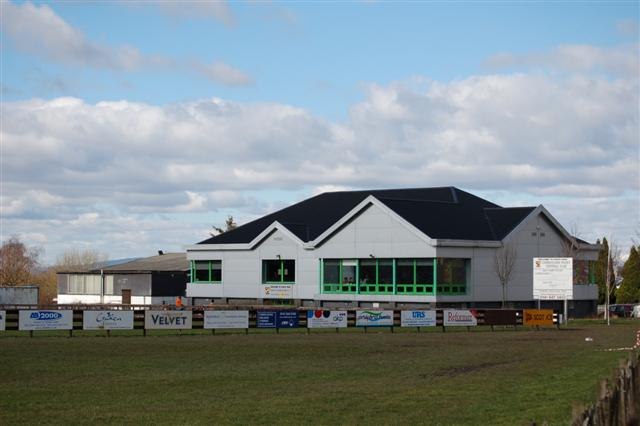
Coats Park clubhouse

Cambuslang RFC is a rugby football club belonging to the Scottish Rugby Union and based in Cambuslang, South Lanarkshire, Scotland. Established in 1903, they currently play in West Division One with home games at Coats Park.

== History ==
On 7 August 1903 a meeting was held under the presidency of the late H. Shepherd, Esq., at which it was decided to form a rugby club at Cambuslang.

The Club commenced playing at Greenlees Farm, and under the guidance of Mr. Shepherd and Dr. T. D. Laird, its Honorary President, it went from strength to strength until the beginning of the 1914–1918 War. During this period, the club progressed to the extent of running two teams, raising funds, and building a small clubhouse.

During the same period, there was in existence the Cambuslang Cricket Club, which was then under the wing of the late J. S. Paul, esq. For some time, the two clubs worked together, but owing to the difficulty of finding a field, which the former did not require in the summer, no permanent arrangements were made, and indeed, the Rugby Club itself had to later change its ground to a field at Eastfield.

All through this period, the club took a leading place in sport in the West of Scotland and was a member of the Old Football Union. It was only natural that after the Armistice, the club would revive. For a short period, the club played at Greenlees Farm, but in 1921, a lease of the ground at Coats Park was arranged, and the club took up residence in what was to become its permanent home. At this time, with a ground of its own, the club joined up with the cricket club and was reconstituted as the "Cambuslang Athletic Club." In addition to rugby and cricket, there were sections for hockey and, at one time, association football. The Cricket Club, under the guidance of C.W. Gibb, Esq., progressed from strength to strength and was only eclipsed by a halcyon period in the Rugby Section's history when stalwarts such as G. Marquand, Dan Spence, the Lairds, and other illustrious figures brought much credit to the club's name.

=== Home Becomes Coats Park ===
In the season 1921–22 and again in 1922–23, Cambuslang were Western District Champions, as a result of which they were offered a match against a West of Scotland Senior Select XV that contained one or two internationalists. This game took place in 1924, and Cambuslang can be justly proud of a 5–0 result in their favour. Another honour to the club at that time was being the first team to play at the Old Anniesland against the High School F.P.'s, which honour they celebrated by being the first team to score on the school's new pitch.

At this stage in the club's development and the instigation of the late J. M. Barr Esq., who had been the club's first captain in 1903, a large and influential committee was formed, which, under the guidance and chairmanship of the late Henry Noble esq., raised sufficient funds to purchase Coats Park outright and erect a clubhouse in the present location, and in doing so secured the future of the club.

In the years that ensued, while not attaining large heights, the Rugby Section continued as a leading team in the West of Scotland, running up to three XV's and, at one point, a junior team. The Cricket Section went from strength to strength, and its Saturday afternoon games had become, in the thirties, a social event in the district.

In fact, all through the interwar period, the club had developed more and more into an organization of the young people of the district and was to be found in the lead in many local events.

Its pre-war Saturday evening dances held in the Institute were ever popular, and its annual whist drives and sales of work were looked forward to universally. But these functions were, of course, the special territory of the ladies of the hockey section, whose results at the end of the season often put other sections to shame.

The club trained in August 1939, but due to the outbreak of war on September 3, they did not play a game again until 1946/47, when the club had a single XV playing on the public pitches at Nether Pollok.

During the war, Coats Park was used by Clyde Paper Mill for storing huge bales of esparto grass. The clubhouse was kept in order by a founder member, Dr. Hutchison, who more or less single-handedly kept the club afloat.

=== The Post War years ===
In 1947–48 the club was back at Coats Park with two XV's again playing their traditional round of friendly games. The area at the back of the wooden clubhouse around the bath was completely rotten and this was replaced by a brick building.

In 1953 a memorable dinner was held in the former Cambuslang Golf Clubhouse in Clydeford Road to celebrate 50 years of the club.

The whole of the old clubhouse, a 1914–1918 ex-army hut, was becoming increasingly dilapidated and required more and more maintenance. In 1957 a former player Kenny Walker enlisted nine senior club members and each of them loaned the club £100 each and with this £1,000 the shell of a new clubhouse was built.

The internal divisions were built by the players themselves. It was very basic. At one end there was a large dressing room for the home teams and two smaller rooms for visitors, in the middle there was a tea room with the kitchen off it and at the other end a changing room for the ladies hockey team with a toilet and shower.

The brick extension at the rear housed a couple of showers and a sunken team bath. This bath had originally been tiled but over the years the tiles had broken and been removed leaving a rough concrete surface. For some obscure design reason there was an open roofed area which housed a unique urinal, composed of a length of ogee guttering with a household tap at one end. It was primitive but it worked. Water was heated by a coal boiler, which had to be lit and stoked on match days. After four teams had washed in the bath the consistency and colour of the water was similar to that of the pitches mud.

When no rugby was being played the hockey girls used the team bath much to the delight of the groundsman who had a peep-hole through from the kitchen ostensibly so he could control the filling of the bath.

What is now Langlea Road was only a farm track leading to Whitlawburn Farm and bounded with a high hawthorn hedge. The balls convener was kept busy as the thorns were always puncturing balls. Sometimes four were required in the course of a single game.

In 1957, Coats Park Colliery which was situated on the site of the present 3rd XV pitch closed. This area was an industrial wilderness with massive railway lines, rusty machinery, and derelict buildings. However, in time this was all removed. The Whitlaw Burn which ran at the back of the club's pitches was piped in and the bing was bulldozed and grass sown.

Around this time there was an upsurge of interest in the club and the number of players increased until the club was regularly fielding four senior XV's. It was felt that the clubs traditional strip of claret and amber horizontal stripes was too similar to that of Glasgow High School and West of Scotland so the present jersey based on an old established tie design was adopted.

=== No Alcohol? ===
Tours to the North of England were a regular feature in the early 1960s.

As the constitution was strongly against alcohol, the clubhouse was dry and the club had several hostelries that they favoured at various times. The Railway Tavern – now Findlays, in Cambuslang Main Street, the Wooden Cask at Silverbanks, the Fairway in Rutherglen, and the Cambus Court all received patronage.

Although the clubhouse was now reasonable, the pitches were not. Mining subsidence caused a drop in one area of 16 ft between 1946 and 1962 and standing on the center spot of the 2nd XV pitch it was impossible to see the crossbar of one of the goals.

The cost of levelling the ground was far beyond the limited finances of the club. At this time Cathkin High School was being built and Lanark County Council approached the club and offered to level, drain and reseed the team's area if the club allowed them to dump soil from the school site.

The team was also given the temporary use of the two Hill 90 pitches. It was an offer Cambuslang could not refuse yet it nearly finished the club.

=== Hard Times at Cambuslang ===
The plan was to coup one winter and spring, prepare the ground during the summer, and reseed in the autumn. This would have allowed the club back on to new level pitches the following autumn.

Unfortunately it did not go according to plan. The contractor chosen by the council had never worked on a sports ground previously. His work was so poor that then President, Bobby Robertson, a Civil Engineer by profession, categorically refused to accept it. The contractor was not paid for what he had done and as a result went bankrupt. This caused a lengthy delay before a new contractor was appointed who finished the job about two years late.

Vandals broke into the clubhouse and not only removed or destroyed everything of value but also took historic, irreplaceable club photographs. The poor playing conditions affected the membership, and for a time the club was struggling to field one team. Money was short and it was only the loyalty of a few dedicated members that allowed the club to continue. After a show game to open the new pitches the club slowly began to improve.

=== The National Leagues ===
When leagues started in 1973 the club narrowly escaped being in the District rather than the National League. The team slowly managed to improve its playing standard from Division VI in 1975/76 to Division V in 1977/78, to Division IV in 1980/81, (when Currie were in the VII Division), then in 1983/84 the giddy heights of finishing fourth in Division III which is the highest they have ever managed.

Relegation to Division IV in 1986–87 followed.

The greatest success of the club up to this time was in the 1991–92 season when, in successive cup games, it defeated Kilmarnock, West of Scotland, and, its best result ever, Stewarts Melville, who were beaten despite fielding Douglas Wyllie a Scottish international and Finlay Calder a former Scottish and British Lions captain. It took a Boroughmuir team full of district and international players to eventually knock Cambuslang RFC out.

=== The Present Day ===
After a disappointing season, 1998–99, which saw Cambuslang relegated to National League Division 3, there has been a distinct upturn in fortunes for the club.

Cambuslang were promoted from National Division 3 in season 1999–00 and from National Division 2 in season 2000–01. In their second season in National Division 1, 2002–03 they achieved a 5th-place finish and courtesy of league reconstruction, were promoted to Premier Division 3.

Season 2005–06 saw Cambuslang maintain their Premier Division 3 status and striving to perform at the highest possible level. The club continues to field a 2nd and 3rd XV each week and has a thriving junior section.

== Cambuslang Sevens ==
The club hosts the Cambuslang Sevens tournament.

== Other sports ==
Several local organisations also make use of the Coats Park facilities, including Cambuslang Harriers, one of Scotland's leading running clubs, and Tír Conaill Harps, a Gaelic football club.

== Honours ==
- Cambuslang Sevens
  - Champions: 1996
- Glasgow City Sevens
  - Champions: 1996
- St. Mungos Sevens
  - Champions: 1984, 1986, 1988
- Lanarkshire Sevens
  - Champions: 1976
- Drumpellier Sevens
  - Champions: 1992

== Notable former players ==
=== Scotland Internationalists ===
- Jonny Gray
- Richie Gray
- Duncan Weir

=== Scotland 7s internationalists ===
- Scott Forrest
