= Iain Ross =

Scotland international rugby union player (1928–2024)

- Born: Iain Anderson Ross; 15 December 1928 Glasgow, Scotland
- Died: 11 June 2024 (aged 95)

Rugby union career
- Position: Scrum half
Amateur team(s)
Years	Team	Apps	(Points)
- Hillhead HSFP
Provincial / State sides
Years	Team	Apps	(Points)
- Glasgow District
International career
Years	Team	Apps	(Points)
1951	Scotland	4	(0)

Iain Anderson Ross (15 December 1928 – 11 June 2024) was a Scotland international rugby union player. Ross played as a scrum half.

== Rugby career ==
=== Amateur career ===
Ross played for Hillhead HSFP.

=== Provincial career ===
Ross played for Glasgow District in the 1950 Inter-City match against Edinburgh District. The Herald picked out Ross, J. A. Fergusson and J.C. Dawson as Glasgow's best players in an 11 - 3 victory.

Ross also played in the Scottish Inter-District Championship. He played in the 1954–55 season's match against North and Midlands and in the same season's Inter-City match against Edinburgh District.

=== International career ===
Ross was capped for Scotland four times in 1951, playing in all four Five Nations matches of that year.

== Outside of rugby ==
Ross was in the Services before his rugby career.

Ross often went angling with fellow former Hillhead HSFP player Allan Cameron.

Ross died on 11 June 2024, at the age of 95.
