= William Alexander Ross =

Scotland international rugby union player

William Alexander Ross (15 November 1913 – 28 September 1942) was a Scottish international rugby union player, who was killed in World War II.

He was capped twice for Scotland in 1937 at fly-half. He also played for Hillhead RFC.

== See also ==
- List of Scottish rugby union players killed in World War II

== Sources ==
- Bath, Richard (ed.) The Scotland Rugby Miscellany (Vision Sports Publishing Ltd, 2007 ISBN 1-905326-24-6)
- Massie, Allan A Portrait of Scottish Rugby (Polygon, Edinburgh; ISBN 0-904919-84-6)
