= Cartha RFC =

Scottish rugby union club

(Scotland) Cartha RFC
- Full name: Cartha Rugby Football Club
- Union: Scottish Rugby Union
- Founded: 1906
- Disbanded: 1974
- Location: Glasgow

Cartha RFC was a twentieth-century Glasgow-based rugby union club. The club merged with Queens Park F.P. to form Cartha Queens Park in 1974.

== History ==
The rugby club grew out of a Cartha Athletic Club which started in 1889. The athletic club branched out into various sports among them:- football (1891), hockey (1890), cricket (1891) and tennis.

=== Formation of the rugby club ===
By 1906 a rugby club had formed. It was admitted to the SRU in 1908.

=== Ground ===
The club initially played its matches at Dumbreck.

== Merger ==
The two southside clubs of Cartha RFC and Queens Park F.P. were struggling by the end of the 1973–74 season. Cartha was mid-table in the Division 5 West league; whilst Queens Park F.P. finished bottom with the fate of relegation hanging over them.

So for the following season 1974-75 the two clubs decided to merge to try and strengthen their position.

== Cartha Sevens ==
The club began its own Sevens tournament in 1935, then known as the Cartha Sevens. It continued after the merger with Queens Park F.P. in 1974 as the Cartha Queens Park Sevens; it is now known as the Glasgow City Sevens.

== Honours ==
- Helensburgh Sevens
  - Champions (1) : 1974
- Kilmarnock Sevens
  - Champions (1) : 1953

== Notable former players ==
=== Scotland international players ===
The following former Cartha players went on to represent Scotland.

- (Scotland) James Youll Turnbull
