= William Black (physician) =

Irish physician, pharmacologist and medical statistician

William Black MD, LRCP
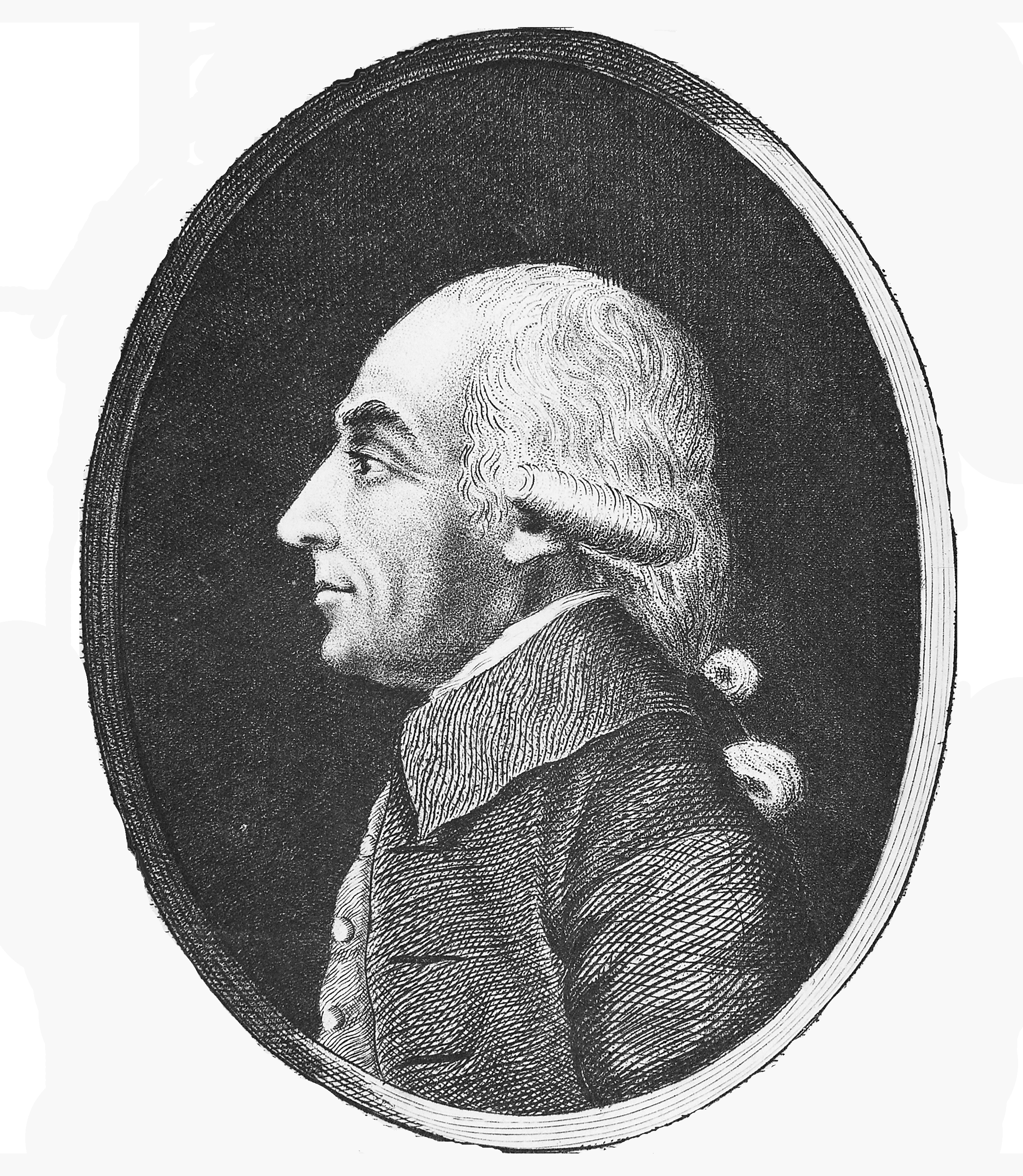
- Portrait, engraved by R. Stanier, published by John Sewell (1790)
- Born: 1749; Ireland
- Died: 1829 (aged 79–80); Hammersmith, England
- Education: Leiden University
- Occupation(s): Physician, writer
- Known for: First physicians to publish statistical data on diseases and mortality
- Medical career
- Institutions: College of Physicians

William Black, LRCP (1749–1829) was an Irish physician and writer on medicine. He graduated MD at Leyden in 1772, and was made LRCP in 1787. He practised in London, and was one of the first English-speaking physicians who published (1783) statistics of diseases and mortality.

== Life ==
William Black was born in Ireland in 1749; studied medicine, according to Munk, at Leyden, and took his degree as MD there on 20 March 1772 with an inaugural dissertation De diagnosi, prognosi, et causis mortis in febribus. He was admitted a Licentiate of the College of Physicians on 2 April 1787, and afterwards practised in London, residing in Piccadilly. He appears to have retired from practice before his death. He died at Hammersmith in December 1829, in his eightieth year.

== Legacy ==
Black did not attain any remarkable eminence in his profession, but wrote some books which are not without value as illustrating the application of the statistical method to medicine. He was one of the first writers, at least in England, who showed that statistics, which had been previously employed chiefly in political and commercial matters, might be of great service to the progress of medicine.

Being invited to deliver the 'annual oration' before the Medical Society of London, he expanded this lecture into an octavo volume, entitled A Comparative View of the Mortality of the Human Species at all Ages, and of Diseases and Casualties, with Charts and Tables, published in 1788. Before half the first edition was sold he cancelled the remainder and brought out a second and corrected edition, as An Arithmetical and Medical Analysis of the Diseases and Mortality of the Human Species, 8vo, London, 1789. In this his design was to exhibit births, mortality, diseases, and casualties as being subject to arithmetical proof, to construct in fact a 'medical arithmetic', a phrase evidently suggested by the 'Political Arithmetic' of Sir William Petty. Although the efforts of Black have long been eclipsed by the brilliant results of Louis, Quetelet, and others in the same field, they had considerable importance in their day. The Dissertation on Insanity is an expansion of a chapter in this book, and was based on observations furnished by an official of Bethlehem Hospital. His Sketch of the History of Medicine is a slight work, but was translated into French by Coray.

== Works ==
1. Observations, Medical and Political, on the Smallpox, the Advantages and Disadvantages of General Inoculation, and on the Mortality of Mankind at every age, 8vo, London, 1781.
2. A Comparative View of the Mortality of the Human Species at all Ages, and of Diseases and Casualties, with Charts and Tables, London, 1788.
3. An Arithmetical and Medical Analysis of the Diseases and Mortality of the Human Species, 8vo, London, 1789.
4. A Historical Sketch of Medicine and Surgery from their Origin to the Present Time, with a Chronological Chart of Medical and Surgical Authors, 8vo, London, 1782. In French, Paris, 1798.
5. Reasons for preventing the French, under the mask of liberty, from trampling on Europe, 8vo, 1792.
6. Observations on Military and Political Affairs by General Monk, new edition, 8vo, 1796.
7. A Dissertation on Insanity, illustrated with tables from between two and three thousand cases in Bedlam, 8vo, London, 1810; second edition 1811.

== See also ==
- Francis Clifton
- Medical statistics
