= W.C.W. Murdoch =

Scotland international rugby union player

William Murdoch
- Born: William Copeland Wood Murdoch; Oct. 3, 1914 Old Kilpatrick, Scotland
- Died: October 12, 1987 1987 (aged 72–73) Helensburgh, Scotland
- Occupation: Rugby union referee

Rugby union career
- Position: Full Back
Amateur team(s)
Years	Team	Apps	(Points)
-	Hillhead HSFP		
Provincial / State sides
Years	Team	Apps	(Points)
- Glasgow District
International career
Years	Team	Apps	(Points)
1935–48	Scotland	9	
Refereeing career
Years	Competition		Apps
1951–52	Five Nations Championship		2
1953	Scottish Inter-District Championship		1

William Copeland Wood Murdoch (3 October 1914, Old Kilpatrick – October 1987, Helensburgh) was a Scottish international rugby union player who played at full-back.

== Rugby Union career ==
=== Amateur career ===
Murdoch played for Hillhead HSFP

=== Provincial career ===
Murdoch played for Glasgow District

=== International career ===
He was capped a total of nine times, but there was an extremely long hiatus in his career due to the Second World War – he gained his first cap in 1935, and his last in 1948. He gained four caps in the 1947–48 season. This gives him one of the longest international careers on record. Only he and W.B. Young were capped on either side of the War.

=== Referee career ===
In later life, he became a referee.
