= Bill Black (voice director) =

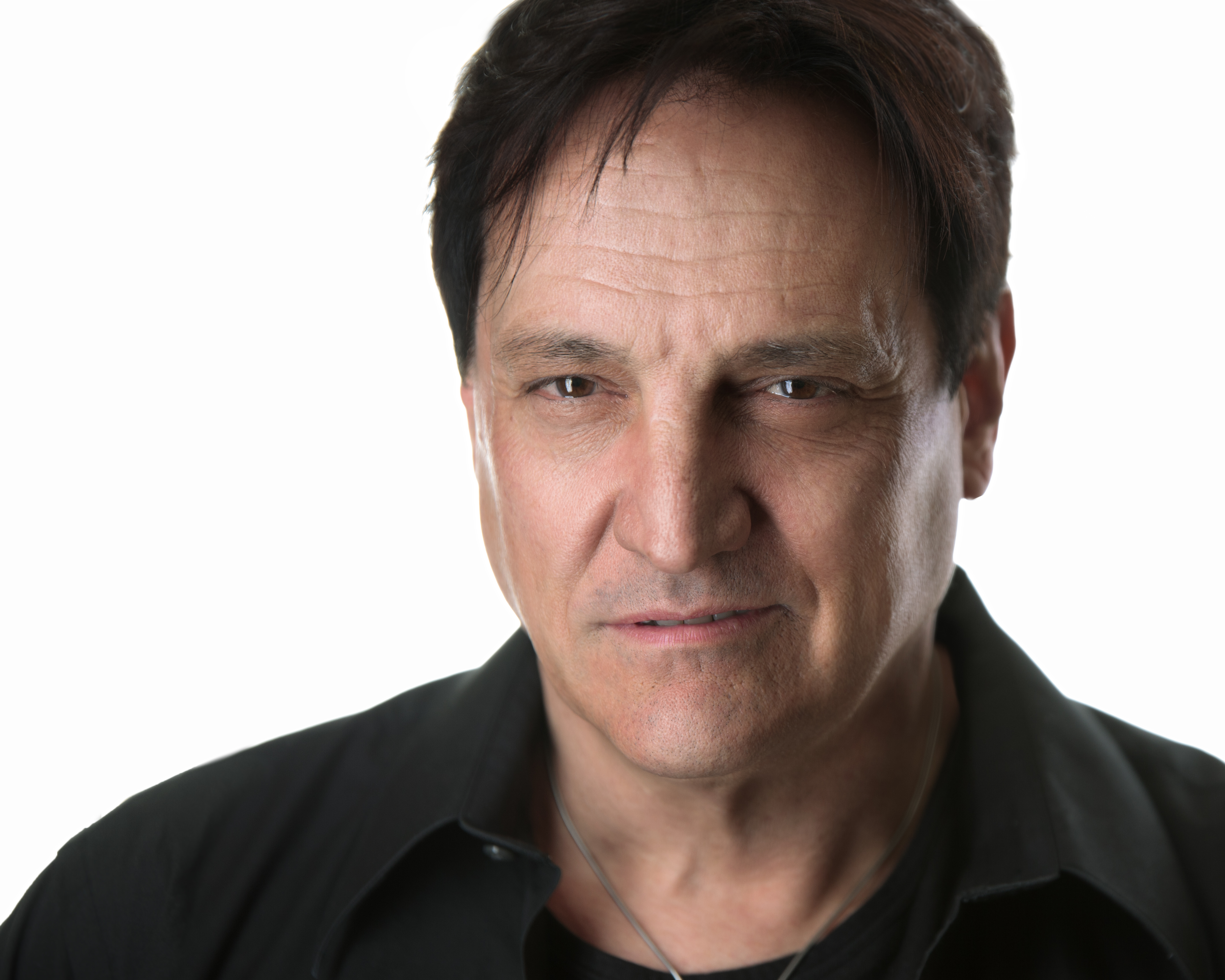
- Bill Black Hollywood, California 2015

Background information
- Born: William Thomas Blackwell III; Long Beach, California, United States
- Genres: Rockabilly, rock, soundtrack, house, trance, classical
- Instrument: Bass guitar. guitar. keyboards
- Years active: 1981–present
- Website: http://www.billblackonline.com

Bill Black is an America Voice Over Director & Published Music composer based in Los Angeles, California.

== Early life ==
Bill Black (real name William Thomas Blackwell III) was born in Long Beach, California. August 18, 1960. He started out in music on bass guitar in the Los Angeles clubs with a rockabilly trio, James Intveld and the Rockin' Shadows. Black left and was replaced by Patrick Woodward. The band split up when Ricky Nelson asked drummer Ricky Intveld and Woodward to join his backing band. All were killed on 31 December 1985 when the plane in which they were travelling crashed in De Kalb, Texas less than two miles from a landing strip at approximately 5.14pm.

== Career ==
In the late 1980s, Black was contracted by Activision to create audio and MIDI tracks for their games. In 1995 he began sound design & casting & directing character voice over for video games under the name Big Fat Kitty Productions (later Bill Black Audio Video). He worked with Geoff Farr to design sound for Gina & TL, a 2002 Sundance Film Festival pick for animated shorts. The same year, Black and composer Paul Chiten created the sound that opens and closes the Tokyo Stock Exchange. Black was the CFO of Buzzart Enterprises Inc., the publishing company of Buzzy Linhart until he retired from that post in 2020.

In the mid 1990’s, Black was contracted by Activision to create SFX & cast & Direct Actors for their games. This led to several game developers asking him to cast & direct voice over for video game He continues to Produce Cast & Direct character voice over for video games from his Beverly Hills based business, The Bill Black LLC.

== Television and film ==
Black's musical compositions have been used in Law and Order and the Showtime series StreetTime.

CBS Series Law and Order Criminal Intent Episode 119 with Paul Chiten.

CBS Movie of the Week Spring Break Shark Attack with Paul Chiten.

ABC Sports The Extremist with John Sinclair

Showtime The Red Shoe Diaries Episode 15 Forbidden Zone with Jay Reynolds
