= Aaron Collins (rugby union) =

New Zealand rugby union player (born 1971)

- Born: Aaron Collins; 25 June 1971 (age 55) New Zealand
- Height: 6 ft 2 in (1.88 m)
- Weight: 104 kg (16 st 5 lb)
- Notable relatives: John Collins (father); Ingrid Collins (mother)

Rugby union career
- Position: Centre
Amateur team(s)
Years	Team	Apps	(Points)
- Glasgow Academicals
–	West of Scotland		
–	Oban Lorne RFC		
Senior career
Years	Team	Apps	(Points)
1997-99	Glasgow Warriors	3	(0)
–	Harlequins		
Provincial / State sides
Years	Team	Apps	(Points)
- Poverty Bay
-	Waikato		
-	Bay of Plenty		
–	King Country		
Coaching career
- Years: Team
- 2006-07: Hillhead Jordanhill RFC
- 2007: Biggar RFC

Aaron Collins (born 25 June 1971 in New Zealand) is a New Zealand rugby union player and now coach. He normally played at the Centre position; and previously played for Glasgow Warriors and Glasgow Academicals and West of Scotland.

== Rugby Union career ==
=== Amateur career ===
By virtue of a grandfather born in Blackburn, West Lothian - Aaron Collins was Scottish-Qualified - and in 1994 he was also playing in Scotland for Glasgow Academicals.

He played for amateur side West of Scotland in 1997 and 1998

He was back playing with West of Scotland in 2002.

He played again for Glasgow Accies in a memorial match for Gordon Mackay in 2012.

Collins played for Oban Lorne RFC in the 2014-15 season.

=== Provincial and professional career ===
Aaron represented Waikato province against the British and Irish Lions in 1993. At the time Collins was playing for Hamilton Old Boys. Collins is one of the select players to have played for four New Zealand provinces: Poverty Bay, Waikato, Bay of Plenty and King Country. He played in New Zealand between 1991 and 1997.

He was called up by Glasgow Warriors in the 1997–98 and 1998-99 season. He was on the bench for the professional provincial side on 4 January 1988 in a Scottish Inter-District Championship match against Caledonia Reds. He played in the Heineken Cup for Glasgow in the 1998-99 season against Pontypridd RFC. He also played in some of Glasgow's Welsh matches in the WRU Challenge Cup of the 1998-99 season.

Collins also played for Harlequins in England.

=== International career ===
He was to play for a Scotland Sevens side named Rugby Ecosse in 1998 in the Air France International Sevens scoring a try against Argentina Sevens side.

=== Coaching career ===
He coached Hillhead Jordanhill in the 2006-07 season.

Collins became coach of Biggar RFC in 2007.

== Family ==
His father John Collins was an All Black in 1964.
