= Uddingston RFC =

Scottish rugby union club, based in Uddingston

(Scotland) Uddingston RFC
- Union: Scottish Rugby Union
- Founded: 1906; 120 years ago
- Location: Uddingston, South Lanarkshire, Scotland
- President: (England)
- Coach: (Scotland)
- Captain: (Scotland)
- League: West Division Two
- 2019–20: West Division Two, 10th of 10
Team kit

Official website
- www.pitchero.com/clubs/uddingston/teams/36669

Uddingston Rugby Football Club is a rugby union team, based in Uddingston, South Lanarkshire, Scotland. The club's home is at Uddingston Cricket and Sports Club, Bothwell Castle Policies, Castle Avenue, Uddingston. G71 7HJ. In addition to Senior 1st and 2nd XV teams the club also has a youth rugby section. In 2021, Uddinston formed a womens team: The Selkies.

== Season 2013–14 ==
The 1st XV won the West Regional League West Three title losing only one game. The team also won the RBS West Regional Bowl and were semi-finalists in the RBS National Bowl competition narrowly losing to the eventual winners.

== Early history ==
The 6 October 1906 saw the birth of one of Lanarkshire's oldest rugby clubs when the newly formed Uddingston Rugby Club played their first competitive fixture at Birkenshaw Park against Bearsden 2nd XV. The result, a 21 - 8 victory for Uddingston, known as "the Villagers", put them on the rugby map and their opening season went on to be more successful than they could have hoped. Within 12 months playing numbers had risen and a 2nd XV was established. Guided through the early years by Club President John Walker, and ably assisted by Honorary President, ex-Scottish internationalist, GT Neilson, Uddingston were quick to establish themselves on the fixture lists of some of the country's well respected clubs.

By their second season Uddingston were regular opponents for the second XV's of West of Scotland, Glasgow Accies, Glasgow High School FP and Kelvinside Accies. During those first seasons notable results were achieved with the likes of Craigielea, Glasgow High School FP, Bishopbriggs, Lenzie and Bellahouston Accies all failing to defeat the newcomers. Following such a promising start, and having established themselves on the ‘circuit’, the Great War brought matters to a temporary halt with play not resuming until 1922 when the club were members of the West District Union League. It was during this time that A.E. Harris, T.A. Chambers and R.W. Langrish, later to gain 4 caps for Scotland, were involved on the playing side for Uddingston and normal service was quickly resumed. The mid to late 1920s were possibly the most successful period for the club, winning the league outright and coming second on a number of occasions. With quality right across the park Uddingston supplied the backbone of the Junior District XV for several seasons, eight players in one match alone, and it is reported that a crowd of 5,000 turned out to watch them in a match against Whitecraigs at Deaconbank.

== Inter-war Years ==
The 1930s saw fortunes change and the Villagers suffered one of their worst ever seasons in 1932–33 with only one draw achieved from 22 fixtures. The involvement with the Club of J.A.G. Bisset and P.L. Duff saw this decline reversed and fortunes steadily improved until play was again interrupted, this time by the Second World War.

== Uddingston's British Lion ==
P. Laurie Duff was to go on to become Uddingston's most successful player, moving to Glasgow Accies from where he earned 6 Scottish caps between 1936 and 1939, and achieved the ultimate rugby accolade when he was selected to tour South Africa with the 1938 British Lions. Duff scored the Lions first test try of the tour and securing the winning try in the final test. Laurie never forgot his home club and served as Honorary Vice President from 1968 until well into the 1980s.

== Post-war Years ==
With 1948 seeing play restart it was the early 1950s that brought another period of rebuilding within the club. The arrival of several new players including Jimmy Rhind and Charlie Scott saw the Villagers on the way up. By season 1959–60 a solid team had been established and on 12 March 1960 Uddingston took on Dalziel, handing out a 45–3 thrashing. Things were looking good, but the departure of a number of key players over the next few seasons saw fortunes dip once more with exception of one notable fixture in 1962 against Hamilton. With Hamilton leading 6–0 at half time Uddingston stepped up several gears to secure an 8–6 victory, their first against their local rivals, Douglas Steedman scoring the winning try. The match was played in atrocious weather conditions with spectator's cars supplying makeshift floodlighting to ensure the match could be finished. As the final whistle sounded the car lights flashed on and off, horns were sounded and the celebrations lasted long into the night.

Progress continued over the next few seasons and 1968–69 saw only four defeats from 35 matches, two early season matches and the final two matches when four key players were sidelined through injury. In 1972 the Club went down 49–0 to West of Scotland in the second round of the Glasgow Cup, not a bad result considering that West only fielded two of their internationalists. 1973 saw Uddingston granted full membership of the Scottish Rugby Union and the restructuring of the Scottish game found the Villagers ‘promoted’ to National Division 5. Life in the National League was not without difficulty and by 1977 Uddingston had been relegated to Division 2 of the Glasgow District league. By 1981 Uddingston had once more climbed into the National Leagues reaching Division 6 in 1983, narrowly losing 16–6 to Heriots FP in the final of the Kilmarnock 7's that same season.

== Recent history ==
On Sunday 1 September 1985 Uddingston celebrated the opening of their new pitch at Bothwell Castle Policies with a fixture between an Uddingston President's XV, which included Scottish Internationalist John Beattie, ably supported by Uddingston's Billy Fulton, Andy Braidwood, Robert Allan, Kenny Roberts and captain John McKerron, and the Co-optimists led by Colin Deans and including Mike DeBusk and Jim Calder. The final score of 54–17 to the Co-optimists was no disgrace given the quality of the opposition.

Unfortunately their stay in the National Leagues was again short lived and by 1986 Uddingston were back playing their rugby in the Glasgow District Leagues where they stayed until 2003 when they were promoted to National Division 5 West (B). 2005 was a good year for the club's 1st XV who lost only one league fixture between January and December. Season 2005–06 finished in style with the Club being crowned Champions of National Division 5 West (B).

== Honours ==
- St. Mungos Sevens
  - Champions: 1982
- Arran Sevens
  - Champions: 2010
