= Bill Black (rugby union) =

Scotland international rugby union player (1928–2019)

- Born: William Pollok Black; 19 February 1928 Rutherglen, Scotland
- Died: 9 May 2019 (aged 91)

Rugby union career
- Position: Prop
Amateur team(s)
Years	Team	Apps	(Points)
- Glasgow HSFP
Provincial / State sides
Years	Team	Apps	(Points)
- Glasgow District
International career
Years	Team	Apps	(Points)
1948-51	Scotland	5	(0)

Bill Black (19 February 1928 – 9 May 2019) was a Scotland international rugby union player who played at prop.

== Rugby union career ==
=== Amateur career ===
Black played for Glasgow HSFP.

=== Provincial career ===
Black played for Glasgow District.

=== International career ===
He was capped a total of five times for the Scotland international team.
