= Bill Black (pilot) =

New Zealand pilot (died 2020)

Bill Black MBE
- Born: William Arthur Black; 18 August 1943; Owaka, New Zealand
- Died: 1 July 2020 (aged 76); Invercargill, New Zealand
- Occupation: Pilot

William Arthur Black MBE (18 August 1943 – 1 July 2020) was a New Zealand fixed-wing and helicopter pilot. He was one of the pioneers of live deer capture from helicopters in Fiordland in the 1960s, and was involved in over 500 search and rescue operations. In the 1977 Queen's Silver Jubilee and Birthday Honours, he was appointed a Member of the Order of the British Empire, for services to search and rescue operations, and in 2014 he was awarded the Jean Batten Memorial Trophy by the Honourable Company of Air Pilots for his contributions to New Zealand aviation.

Black was born in Owaka on 18 August 1943, and died in Invercargill on 1 July 2020, aged 76 years.
