= Hillhead RFC =

Defunct Scottish rugby union club, based in Glasgow

(Scotland) Hillhead RFC
- Full name: Hillhead Rugby Football Club
- Union: Scottish Rugby Union
- Founded: 1904
- Disbanded: 1988; 38 years ago
- Location: Glasgow, Scotland
- Ground(s): Scotstoun Showgrounds; Hughenden

Hillhead Rugby Football Club is a former rugby union football club based in Glasgow, Scotland. Founded in 1904 as a club for former pupils of Hillhead High School, it lasted until 1988 when it merged with Jordanhill RFC to form Hillhead Jordanhill RFC.

== Foundation as a Sports Club ==
Hillhead Sports Club was formed in 1902 as a private club for former pupils of Hillhead High School, catering for various sports including football, cricket, hockey and athletics.

== Rugby and Scotstoun ==
A rugby team, Hillhead High School Former Pupils RFC, was formed in 1904. The club used the Scotstoun Showgrounds as a home until 1922.

== Hughenden ==
The Hillhead club sought to find a permanent home after the First World War, purchasing land at Hughenden in 1922. The club's new home, with its pavilion designed W. Hunter McNab, was officially opened on 24 May 1924.

Due to the growing popularity of the rugby team, a grandstand was built alongside the pitch in 1934, designed by local consulting engineers FA MacDonald. The stand was built of reinforced concrete with a cantilevered roof, unusual for the time. It was first used in September 1934, for a match between Hillhead and Glasgow Academicals.

== Opening of the club ==
In 1969, the clause restricting entry to the club to former students of Hillhead High School is removed to allow better recruitment and the club formerly becomes Hillhead RFC.

== Merger ==
The club was merged with Jordanhill RFC (the rugby club of Jordanhill College) in 1988 to form Hillhead Jordanhill RFC.

== Club Honours ==
The club won the unofficial national title of Scotland in season 1933-34 (shared with Royal HSFP) and in season 1936-37 (shared with Watsonians).

- Glasgow City Sevens
  - Champions (2): 1984, 1987
- Hawick Sevens
  - Champions (1): 1934
- Jed-Forest Sevens
  - Champions (1): 1937

== Notable former players ==
=== Former coaches ===
- Bill Dickinson, Scotland national rugby union coach, 1971–77.

=== Scotland internationalists ===
- (Scotland) William Alexander Ross
- (Scotland) Allan Cameron
- (Scotland) W.C.W. Murdoch
- (Scotland) Iain Ross
- (Scotland) I.A.A. MacGregor

=== Glasgow District players ===
- (Scotland) R.C. Graham
- (Scotland) I.E. Dawson
- (Scotland) I. Wilkie
- (Scotland) A.S. Nicolson
- (Scotland) J.D. Niven
- (Scotland) Allan Cameron
- (Scotland) K.C. Gordon
- (Scotland) I.A.A. MacGregor
- (Scotland) T.E.S. Ferguson
- (Scotland) J.A. Ferguson
- (Scotland) G.M. Guthrie
