= Willie Black (footballer) =

Scottish footballer

Personal information
- Full name: William Loudon Black
- Date of birth: 21 December 1929
- Place of birth: Largs, Scotland
- Date of death: 8 January 2015 (aged 85)
- Place of death: Largs, Scotland
- Position: Forward

Youth career
- Ardrossan Academy

Senior career*
Years	Team	Apps	(Gls)
1946–1957	Queen's Park	41	(0)
1959	Ayr United	0	(0)

International career
1951–1956	Scotland Amateurs	4	(1)
- * Club domestic league appearances and goals

William Loudon Black (21 December 1929 – 8 January 2015) was a Scottish footballer who played as a forward in the Scottish League for Queen's Park. He was capped by Scotland at amateur level.
