= 1920–21 Scottish Districts season =

Rugby union competition

- Countries: Scotland
- Date: 1920–21
- Matches played: 1

The 1920–21 Scottish Districts season is a record of all the rugby union matches for Scotland's district teams.

== History ==
Edinburgh District beat Glasgow District in the Inter-City match.

North v Midlands 17 November 1920.

Cities v Rest 11 Dec 1920.

Probables v Possibles 8 Jan 1921.

== Results ==
Date	Try	Conversion	Penalty	Dropped goal	Goal from mark	Notes
1905–1947	3 points	2 points	3 points	4 points	3 points	

=== Inter-City ===
4 December 1920

Glasgow District	6 – 11	Edinburgh District
	Report

Hamilton Crescent, Glasgow
Attendance: 6,000
Referee: Adam Turnbull (Hawick)

Glasgow District:
Edinburgh District:

=== Other Scottish matches ===
11 December 1920

Provinces District	–	Cities District
	Preview; Report

Mansfield Park, Hawick

Provinces District:
Cities District:

25 December 1920

Provinces District	–	Anglo-Scots
	Preview; Report; Report

Inverleith

Provinces District:
Anglo-Scots:

=== Trial matches ===
8 January 1921

Scotland Probables	–	Scotland Possibles
	Preview; Report; Report; Report

Scotland Probables:
Scotland Possibles:

=== English matches ===
No other District matches played.

=== International matches ===
No touring matches this season.
