= 1921–22 Scottish Districts season =

Rugby union competition

- Countries: Scotland
- Date: 1921–22
- Matches played: 1

The 1921–22 Scottish Districts season is a record of all the rugby union matches for Scotland's district teams.

== History ==
Glasgow District beat Edinburgh District in the Inter-City match.

== Results ==
Date	Try	Conversion	Penalty	Dropped goal	Goal from mark	Notes
1905–1947	3 points	2 points	3 points	4 points	3 points	

=== Inter-City ===
3 December 1921

Glasgow District	8 – 3	Edinburgh District
	Report

New Anniesland, Glasgow
Attendance: 9,000
Referee: Willie Burnet (Hawick)

Glasgow District:
Edinburgh District:

=== Other Scottish matches ===
12 November 1921

Midlands District	v	North of Scotland District
	Report

St. Andrews

Midlands District:
North of Scotland District:

=== Trial matches ===
10 December 1921

Provinces District	9 – 30	Scotland Probables
	Report

Galashiels
Attendance: 8000

Provinces District:
Scotland Probables:

24 December 1921

Scotland Probables	–	Scotland Possibles
	Report

Inverleith
Attendance: 8000

Scotland Probables:
Scotland Possibles:

=== English matches ===
No other District matches played.

=== International matches ===
No touring matches this season.
